= Wedding of Princess Elizabeth and Philip Mountbatten =

1947 British royal wedding

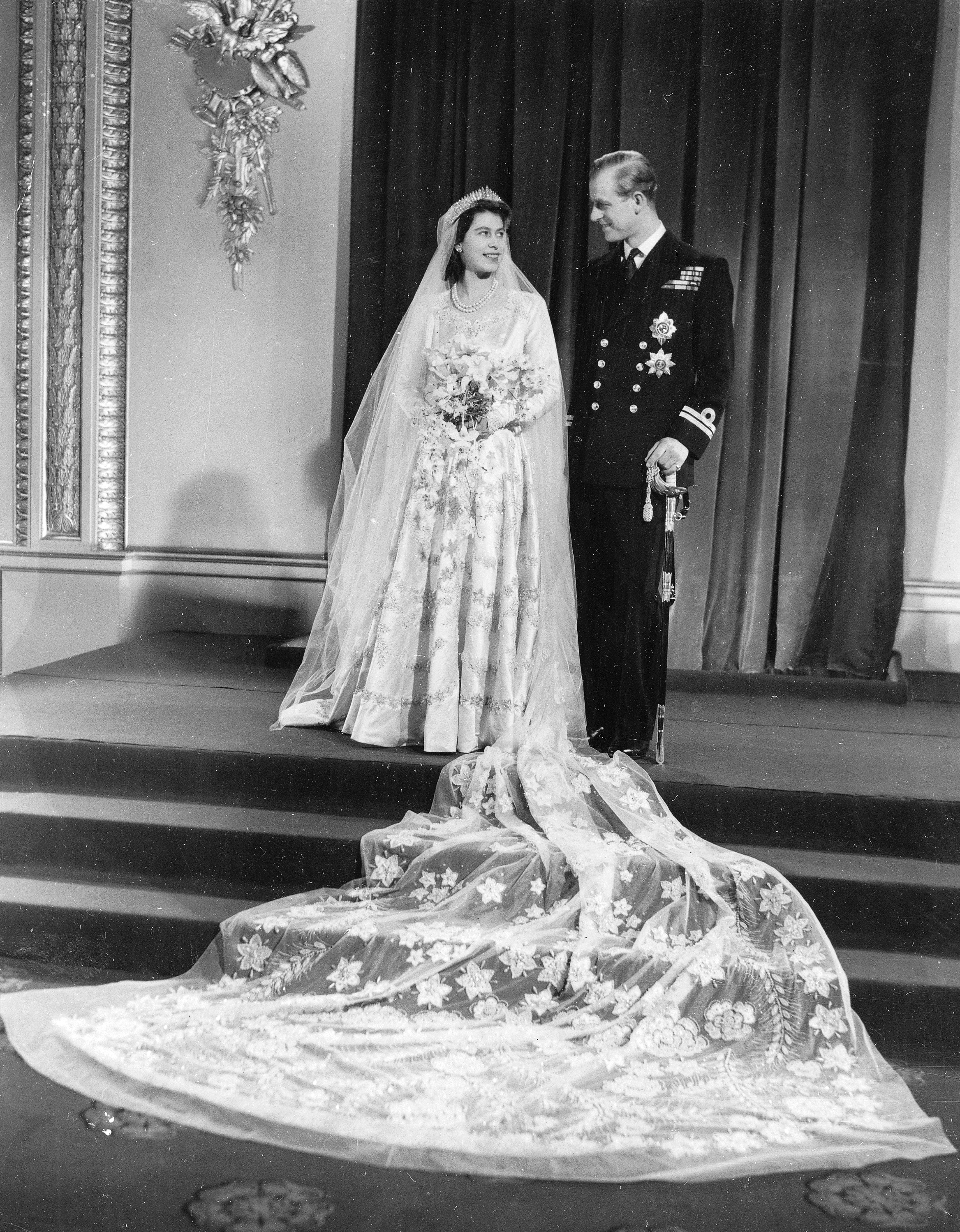
- Princess Elizabeth and Philip Mountbatten after their wedding
- Date: 20 November 1947; 78 years ago
- Venue: Westminster Abbey
- Location: London, England
- Participants: Princess Elizabeth (later Queen Elizabeth II); Sir Philip Mountbatten (later Prince Philip, Duke of Edinburgh)

The wedding of Princess Elizabeth and Philip Mountbatten (later Queen Elizabeth II and Prince Philip, Duke of Edinburgh) took place on Thursday 20 November 1947 at Westminster Abbey in London, United Kingdom. The bride was the elder daughter of King George VI and Queen Elizabeth (later the Queen Mother) as well as the heir presumptive to the British throne. Although Philip was born a prince of Greece and Denmark, he stopped using these foreign titles on his adoption of British nationality four months before the announcement of their marriage. On the morning of the wedding, he was made Duke of Edinburgh, Earl of Merioneth and Baron Greenwich.

== Engagement ==
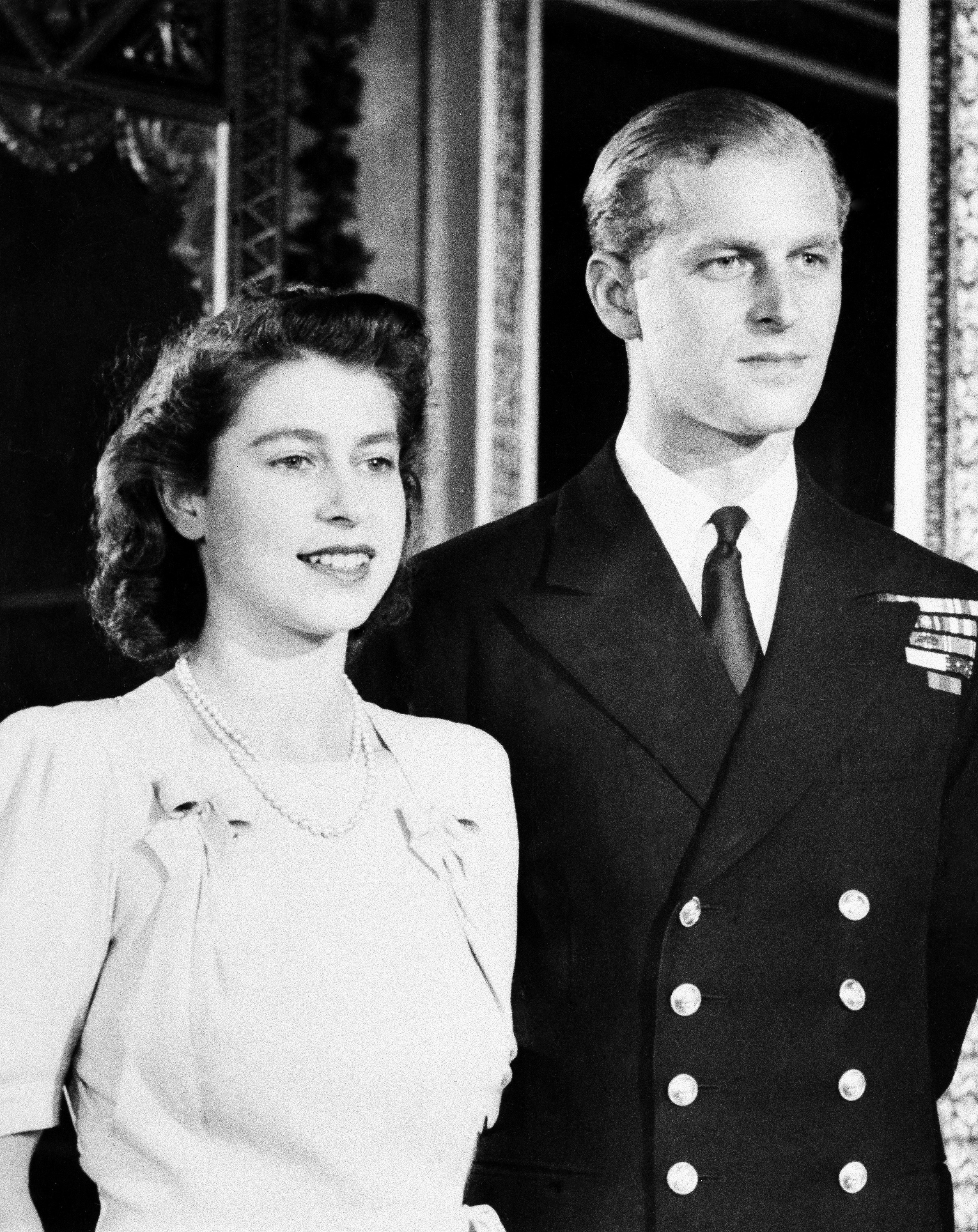
Elizabeth and Philip posing for their engagement photo, 18 September 1947

Elizabeth and Philip were second cousins once removed (by descent from Christian IX of Denmark and Louise of Hesse-Kassel) and third cousins (by descent from Queen Victoria and Prince Albert). Princess Elizabeth met Prince Philip in 1934, at the wedding of Philip's cousin Princess Marina of Greece and Denmark to Prince George, Duke of Kent, paternal uncle of Elizabeth, and again in 1937. After another meeting at the Royal Naval College in Dartmouth in July 1939, Elizabeth—though only 13 years old—fell in love with Philip and they began to exchange letters. An entry in Chips Channon's diary made reference to the future marriage of Elizabeth and Philip as early as 1941, "He is to be our Prince Consort, and that is why he is serving in our Navy."

The couple became secretly engaged in 1946, when Philip asked King George VI for his daughter's hand in marriage. The King granted his request, providing any formal engagement was delayed until Elizabeth's 21st birthday the following April. Their engagement was officially announced on 9 July 1947. Philip proposed to Elizabeth with a 3-carat round diamond ring consisting of "a centre stone flanked by 10 smaller pave diamonds." The diamonds were taken from a tiara that belonged to Philip's mother, Princess Alice of Battenberg, and were also used to create a quatrefoil bracelet for Elizabeth.

The King gave his formal consent to the marriage in his British Privy Council, in accordance with the Royal Marriages Act 1772. The same was done in Canada at a meeting of the King's Canadian Privy Council, with the chief justice of Canada, Thibaudeau Rinfret, standing in as deputy to the King's representative, the governor general of Canada. (Note: George VI had invited Prime Minister of Canada William Lyon Mackenzie King to attend the meeting of the British Privy Council, but Mackenzie King declined and held the meeting of the Canadian Privy Council so as to illustrate the separation between Canada's Crown and that of the UK.)

== Wedding ==
=== Venue ===
Princess Elizabeth and Philip Mountbatten married at 11:30 GMT on 20 November 1947 at Westminster Abbey. Elizabeth became the tenth member of the royal family to be married at the Abbey.

=== Bridal party ===
Princess Elizabeth was attended by eight bridesmaids:

- Princess Margaret (her younger sister);
- Princess Alexandra of Kent (her first cousin);
- Lady Caroline Montagu-Douglas-Scott (daughter of the Duke of Buccleuch and niece of the Duchess of Gloucester);
- Lady Mary Cambridge (her second cousin);
- Lady Elizabeth Lambart (daughter of the Earl of Cavan);
- Lady Pamela Mountbatten (Philip's first cousin);
- Margaret Elphinstone (her first cousin);
- Diana Bowes-Lyon (her first cousin).

Her cousins Prince William of Gloucester and Prince Michael of Kent served as page boys. The bridesmaids wore wreaths "in their hair of miniature white sheaves, Lilies and London Pride, modelled in white satin and silver lame", while the pages wore Royal Stewart tartan kilts.

The best man was the Marquess of Milford Haven, the groom's maternal first cousin. The Marquess was a grandson of Prince Louis of Battenberg and Princess Victoria of Hesse and by Rhine; and a great-great-grandson of Queen Victoria.

=== Wedding attire ===
For her wedding dress, Elizabeth still required ration coupons to buy the material for her gown, designed by Norman Hartnell. The dress was "a duchesse satin bridal gown with motifs of star lilies and orange blossoms." Elizabeth's wedding shoes were made out of satin and were trimmed with silver and seed pearl. Elizabeth did her own makeup for the wedding. Her wedding bouquet was prepared by the florist M. H. Longman, and consisted of "white orchids with a sprig of myrtle". The myrtle was taken from "the bush grown from the original myrtle in Queen Victoria's wedding bouquet". The bouquet was returned to the abbey the day after the service to be laid on the tomb of the Unknown Warrior, following a tradition started by Elizabeth's mother at her wedding in 1923.

On the morning of her wedding, as Princess Elizabeth was dressing at Buckingham Palace before leaving for Westminster Abbey, her tiara snapped. The court jeweller, who was standing by in case of emergency, was rushed to his work room by a police escort. Queen Elizabeth reassured her daughter that it would be fixed in time, and it was. Elizabeth's father gave her a pair of pearl necklaces, which had belonged to Queen Anne and Queen Caroline, as a wedding present. Her diamond and pearl cluster earrings were also family heirlooms, passed down from Princess Mary to Queen Mary's mother the Duchess of Teck. On her wedding day, Elizabeth realised that she had left her pearls at St James's Palace. Her private secretary, Jock Colville, was asked to go and retrieve them. He was able to get the pearls to the princess in time for her portrait in the Music Room of Buckingham Palace.

As a lieutenant in the Royal Navy, Philip wore his dress uniform which was adorned with his medal ribbons and the stars of the Order of the Garter and Order of the Redeemer. He also carried a ceremonial sword, with which he later cut the wedding cake.

=== Wedding service ===
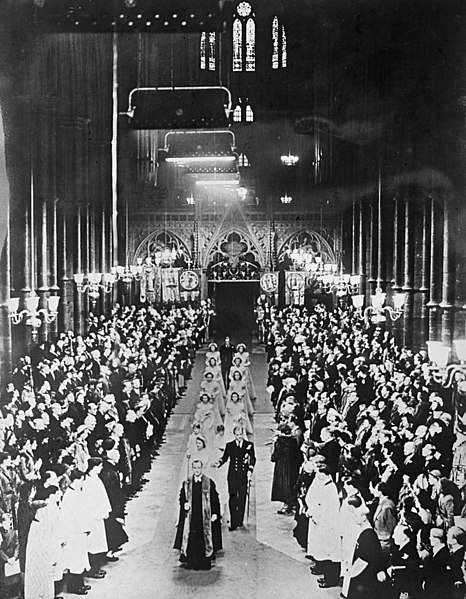
The royal wedding ceremony inside Westminster Abbey

The royal parties were brought in large carriage processions, the first with the Queen and Princess Margaret and later a procession with Queen Mary. Philip left Kensington Palace with his best man, his maternal first cousin the Marquess of Milford Haven. Princess Elizabeth arrived at the Abbey with her father, the King, in the Irish State Coach.

The ceremony was officiated by the Archbishop of Canterbury, Geoffrey Fisher, and the Dean of Westminster Alan Campbell Don. The Archbishop of York, Cyril Garbett, delivered the sermon. The ceremony was recorded and broadcast by BBC Radio to 200 million people around the British Empire and the world.

=== Wedding ring ===
Like her mother's, Princess Elizabeth's wedding band was made of Welsh gold. The ring was made from a nugget of Welsh gold from the Clogau St David's mine, near Dolgellau; this nugget had been given to the then Lady Elizabeth Bowes-Lyon, and used to make her wedding ring and subsequently the wedding rings of both of her daughters. The same nugget was later used to create the wedding rings of Princess Anne and Lady Diana Spencer.

=== Music ===
William Neil McKie, the Australian organist and Master of the Choristers at the abbey, was the director of music for the wedding, a role he again filled at Elizabeth's coronation in 1953. McKie also wrote a motet for the occasion, "We wait for thy loving kindness, O God". Psalm 67, "God be merciful unto us and bless us", was sung to a setting by Sir Edward Cuthbert Bairstow. The anthem was "Blessed be the God and Father of our Lord Jesus Christ" by Samuel Sebastian Wesley; the hymns were "Praise, my soul, the king of heaven", and "The Lord's my Shepherd" to the Scottish tune "Crimond" attributed to Jessie Seymour Irvine, which was largely unknown in the Church of England at the time. A descant to "Crimond" had been taught to Princesses Elizabeth and Margaret by a lady-in-waiting, Lady Margaret Egerton; the music for the descant could not be found two days before the wedding, so the princesses and Lady Margaret sang it to Sir William McKie, who wrote it down in shorthand. The service started with a specially composed fanfare by Arnold Bax and finished with Felix Mendelssohn's "Wedding March". The abbey choir was joined by the choirs of the Chapel Royal and St George's Chapel, Windsor.

=== Titles ===
Before the wedding, Philip renounced his Greek and Danish titles, converted from Greek Orthodoxy to Anglicanism and adopted the style "Lieutenant Philip Mountbatten", taking the surname of his mother's British family. The day before the wedding, King George bestowed the style "Royal Highness" and, on the morning of the wedding, 20 November 1947, he gave Philip the titles Duke of Edinburgh, Earl of Merioneth, and Baron Greenwich of Greenwich in the County of London. Consequently, being already a Knight of the Garter, between 19 and 20 November 1947 he bore the unusual style His Royal Highness Sir Philip Mountbatten and is so described in the Letters Patent of 20 November 1947.

Upon their marriage, Elizabeth took the title of her husband and became Princess Elizabeth, Duchess of Edinburgh.

== Family celebrations ==
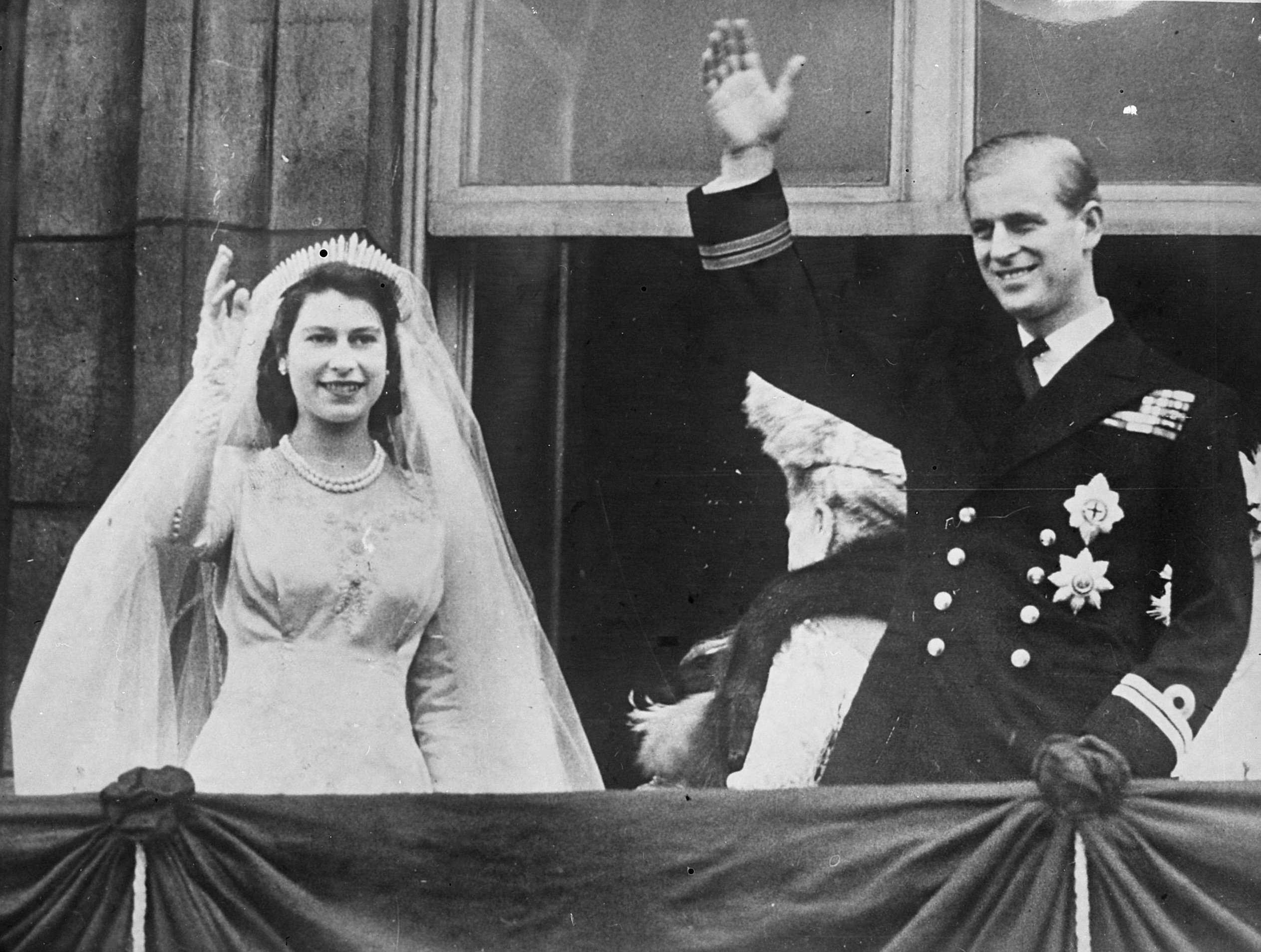
Princess Elizabeth and the Duke of Edinburgh waving to the crowds from the balcony of Buckingham Palace

After the ceremony, Elizabeth and Philip then proceeded to Buckingham Palace, where the couple waved to the crowds from the balcony.

=== Wedding breakfast ===
Their wedding breakfast was held in the Ball-Supper Room of the Palace. The menu included Filet de Sole Mountbatten, Perdreau en Casserole, and Bombe Glacee Princess Elizabeth. Music was played by the string band of the Grenadier Guards.

The official wedding cake was baked by London bakery McVitie & Price. A fruitcake made of four tiers, it stood nine feet high, and weighed about 500 lbs. It was made with 80 oranges, 660 eggs, and over three gallons of Navy Rum. As World War II had ended a mere two years earlier and certain things were still subject to rationing, some of the ingredients used to make the cake were shipped to Britain from around the world; this led to the cake being given the nickname "The 10,000 Mile Cake". Decorations included the coats of arms of both the bride's and the groom's families, as well as the bride and groom's individual monograms, and sugar-iced figures depicting regimental and naval badges, as well as the couple's favourite activities. The couple cut the cake with the Duke of Edinburgh's Mountbatten sword, which had been a wedding gift from his father-in-law, the King.

=== Wedding presents ===
The couple received over 2,500 wedding presents from around the world and around 10,000 telegrams of congratulations. The gifts were put on public display at St James's Palace and made available for public viewing.

The day after the wedding the wedding bouquet was returned to Westminster Abbey and placed on the Tomb of the Unknown Warrior; this tradition was initiated by the bride's mother, Queen Elizabeth, following her marriage to the bride's father, then the Duke of York. The bouquet was composed of white cattleya, odontoglossum, and cypripedium orchids and a sprig of myrtle from the Osborne Myrtle Bush, which had been planted at Osborne House by Queen Victoria in 1846. The flowers in the bouquet were supplied by the Worshipful Company of Gardeners and were arranged by florist MH Longman.

== Guests ==
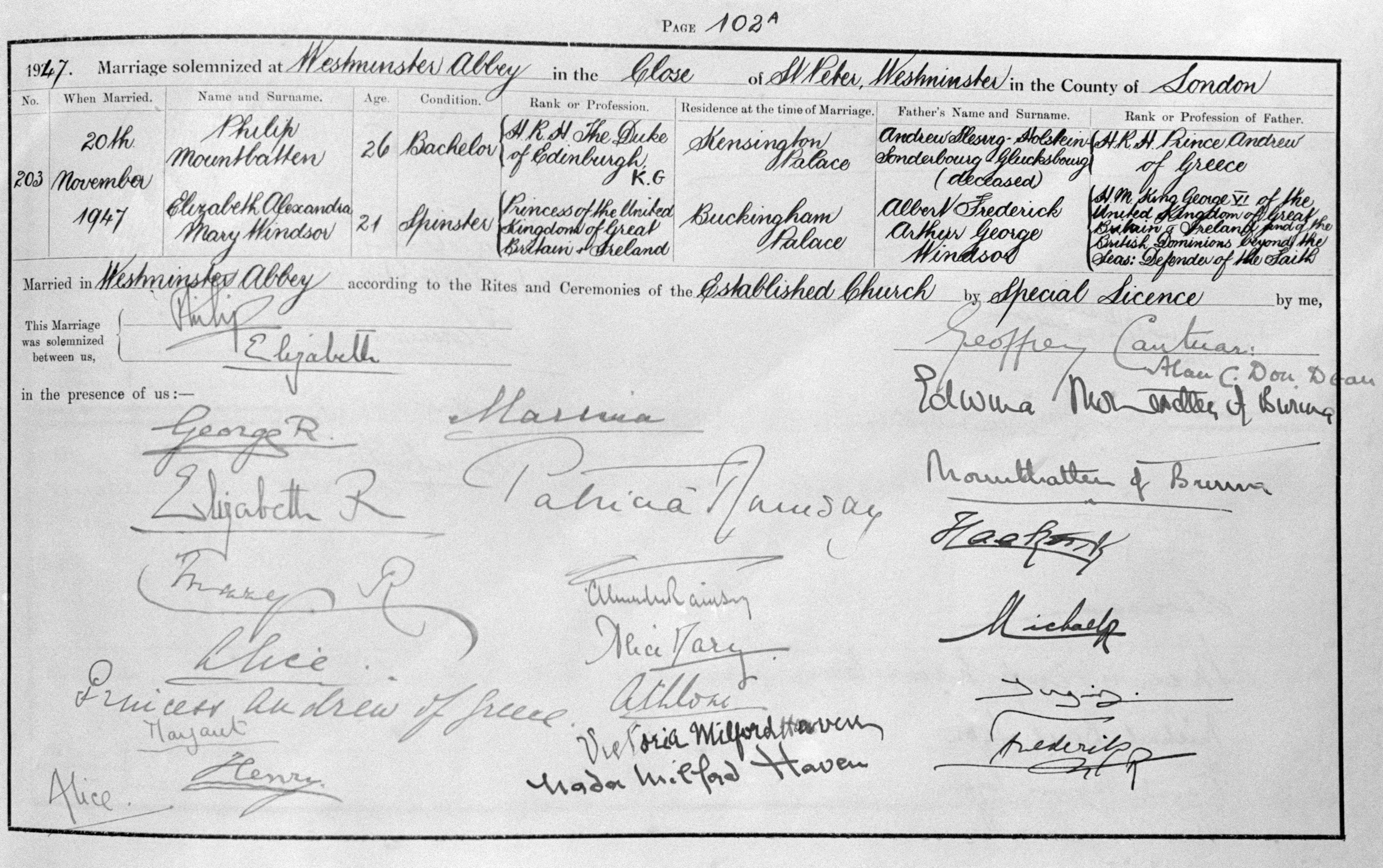
Marriage certificate, signed by Philip, Elizabeth, Elizabeth's father King George VI, Elizabeth's mother Queen Elizabeth, Elizabeth's grandmother Queen Mary, Philip's mother Princess Andrew of Greece and Denmark, Princess Margaret, Prince Henry, Duke of Gloucester, Princess Alice, Duchess of Gloucester, Princess Marina, Duchess of Kent, Lady Patricia Ramsay, Sir Alexander Ramsay, Princess Alice, Countess of Athlone, the Earl of Athlone, Victoria, Marchioness of Milford Haven, the Marchioness of Milford Haven, the Archbishop of Canterbury, the Dean of Westminster, the Countess Mountbatten and Earl Mountbatten of Burma, the King of Norway, the King of Romania, the Queen and King of Denmark

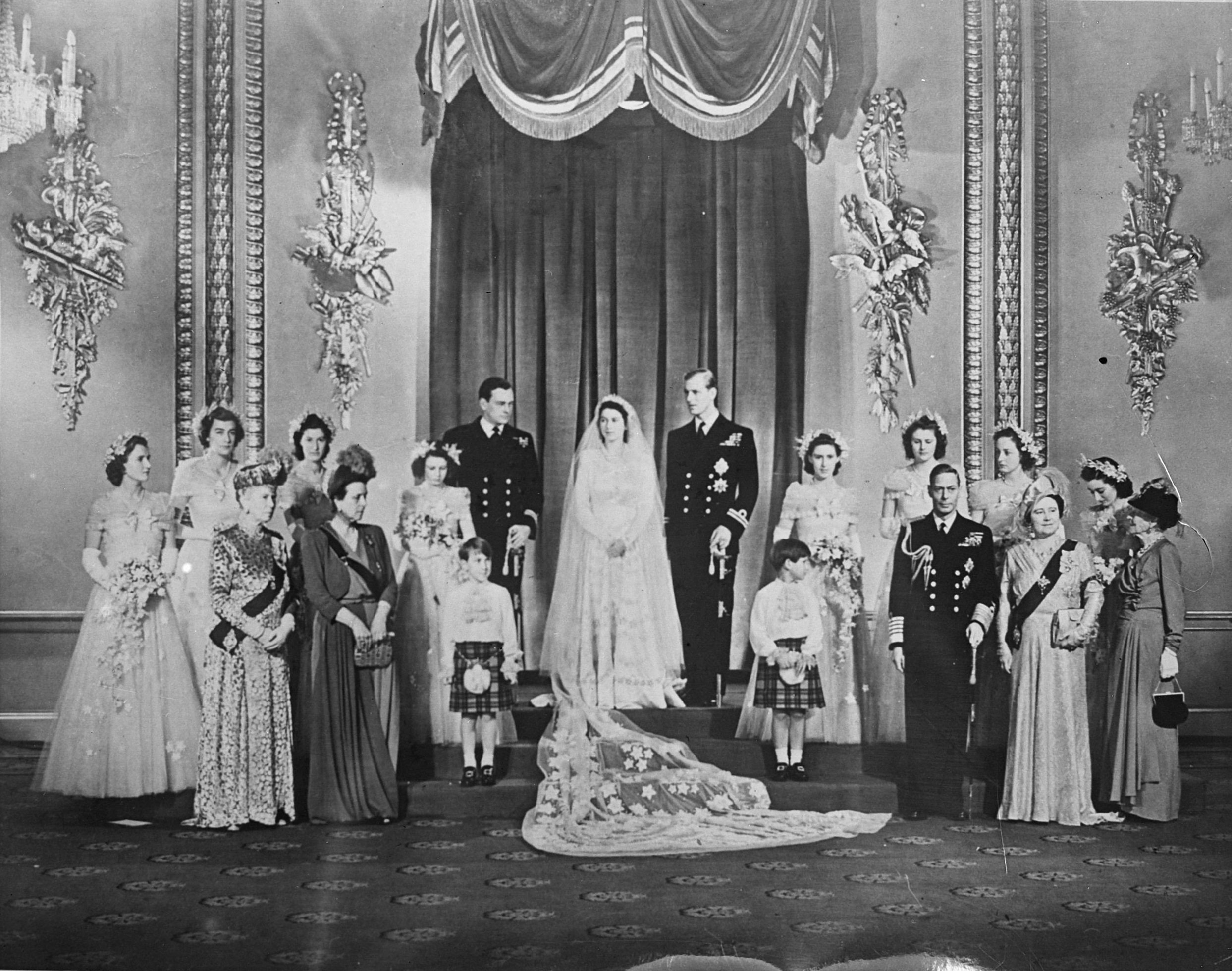
Elizabeth and Philip, along with bridesmaids and family members, posing for photographs

=== Bride's family ===
- The King and Queen, the bride's parents
  - The Princess Margaret, the bride's sister
- Queen Mary, the bride's paternal grandmother
  - The Princess Royal's family:
    - The Earl of Harewood, the bride's first cousin
    - The Hon. Gerald Lascelles, the bride's first cousin
  - The Duke and Duchess of Gloucester, the bride's paternal uncle and aunt
    - Prince William of Gloucester, the bride's first cousin
    - Prince Richard of Gloucester, the bride's first cousin
  - The Duchess of Kent, the bride's paternal aunt by marriage (and the groom's first cousin)
    - The Duke of Kent, the bride's first cousin
    - Princess Alexandra of Kent, the bride's first cousin
    - Prince Michael of Kent, the bride's first cousin
- The Earl of Southesk, widower of the bride's first cousin once removed
  - Lord Carnegie, the bride's second cousin
- Princess Helena Victoria, the bride's and the groom's first cousin twice removed
- Princess Marie Louise, the bride's and the groom's first cousin twice removed
- Lady Patricia and The Hon. Sir Alexander Ramsay, the bride's and the groom's first cousin twice removed and her husband
  - Captain Alexander Ramsay, the bride's and the groom's second cousin once removed
- The Earl of Athlone and Princess Alice, Countess of Athlone, the bride's paternal great-uncle and great-aunt (also first cousin twice removed to the bride and groom)
  - Lady May and Henry Abel Smith, the bride's first cousin once removed and her husband
    - Anne Abel Smith, the bride's second cousin
    - Elizabeth Abel Smith, the bride's second cousin
- The Marquess and Marchioness of Cambridge, the bride's first cousin once removed and his wife
  - Lady Mary Cambridge, the bride's second cousin
- The Duchess and Duke of Beaufort, the bride's first cousin once removed and her husband
- Lady Helena Gibbs, the bride's first cousin once removed
- The Lady and Lord Elphinstone, the bride's maternal aunt and uncle
  - Master of Elphinstone, the bride's first cousin
  - The Hon. Jean and Captain John Wills, the bride's first cousin and her husband
  - The Hon. Andrew and Mrs Elphinstone, the bride's first cousin and his wife
  - The Hon. Margaret Elphinstone, the bride's first cousin
- The Earl of Strathmore and Kinghorne, the bride's maternal uncle
- The Hon. Mrs John Bowes-Lyon, the bride's maternal aunt by marriage
  - Viscountess Anson, the bride's first cousin
  - Diana Bowes-Lyon, the bride's first cousin
- The Countess and Earl Granville, the bride's maternal aunt and uncle
  - Lady Mary Leveson-Gower, the bride's first cousin
  - Lord Leveson, the bride's first cousin
- The Hon. Michael and Mrs Bowes-Lyon, the bride's maternal uncle and aunt
- The Hon. David and Mrs Bowes-Lyon, the bride's maternal uncle and aunt

=== Groom's family ===
- (Kingdom of Greece) Princess Andrew of Greece and Denmark, the groom's mother
- The Dowager Marchioness of Milford Haven, the groom's maternal grandmother
  - The Crown Princess and Crown Prince of Sweden, the groom's maternal aunt and uncle (representing the King of Sweden)
  - The Marchioness of Milford Haven, the groom's maternal aunt by marriage
    - Lady Tatiana Mountbatten, the groom's first cousin
    - The Marquess of Milford Haven, the groom's first cousin (also the best man)
  - The Earl and Countess Mountbatten of Burma, the groom's maternal uncle and aunt
    - The Lady and Lord Brabourne, the groom's first cousin and her husband
    - Lady Pamela Mountbatten, the groom's first cousin
- The Queen and King of Yugoslavia, the groom's first cousin, once removed, and her husband, the bride and groom's third cousin
- (Romania) The Queen Mother of the Romanians, the groom's first cousin
  - (Romania) The King of the Romanians, the groom's first cousin, once removed
- (Kingdom of Greece) The Queen of the Hellenes, wife of the groom's first cousin, also second cousin of the groom (representing the King of the Hellenes)
- The Duchess of Aosta, the groom's first cousin
- Lady Katherine and Major Richard Brandram, the groom's first cousin and her husband
- (Kingdom of Greece) Prince and Princess George of Greece and Denmark, the groom's paternal uncle and aunt
  - Princess Eugénie of Greece and Denmark, the groom's first cousin
- The King and Queen of Denmark, the groom's second cousin and his wife
- Princess Axel of Denmark, the groom's second cousin (also wife of the groom's first cousin once removed)
  - Prince Georg of Denmark, the groom's second cousin
  - Prince Flemming of Denmark, the groom's second cousin
- The King of Norway, the groom's first cousin, once removed and the bride's paternal great-uncle
- Princess and Prince René of Bourbon-Parma, the groom's first cousin, once removed and her husband
  - Princess Anne of Bourbon-Parma, the groom's second cousin
  - Prince Michel of Bourbon-Parma, the groom's second cousin
- The Marquess and Marchioness of Carisbrooke, the groom's first cousin once removed and the bride's first cousin twice removed, and his wife
- Queen Victoria Eugenie of Spain, the groom's first cousin once removed and the bride's first cousin twice removed
  - The Count and Countess of Barcelona, the groom's second cousin and his wife
- The Hereditary Grand Duke of Luxembourg, the groom's third cousin once removed (representing the Grand Duchess of Luxembourg)
- Princess Elisabeth of Luxembourg, the groom's third cousin once removed

=== Others ===
- Prince Tomislav of Yugoslavia, the bride and groom's third cousin
- Prince Andrew of Yugoslavia, the bride and groom's third cousin
- The Prince Regent of Belgium (representing the King of the Belgians)
- Princess Juliana and Prince Bernhard of the Netherlands (representing the Queen of the Netherlands)
- (Kingdom of Iraq) The King of Iraq
- The Duke of Alba and Berwick
- Herbert Morrison, Deputy Leader of the Labour Party
- Wentworth Beaumont, 2nd Viscount Allendale
- Major Thomas Harvey
- Thomas Coke, Viscount Coke
- Lady Margaret Seymour

The Duke of Windsor, the former king, was not invited, and his sister, the Princess Royal, did not attend as she said she was ill (her husband, Henry Lascelles, 6th Earl of Harewood, had died six months before). Ronald Storrs claimed that the Princess Royal did not attend in protest over her brother's exclusion. So soon after the end of World War II, it was not acceptable for the Duke of Edinburgh's German relations, including Philip's three surviving sisters, to be invited to the wedding.

== Honeymoon ==
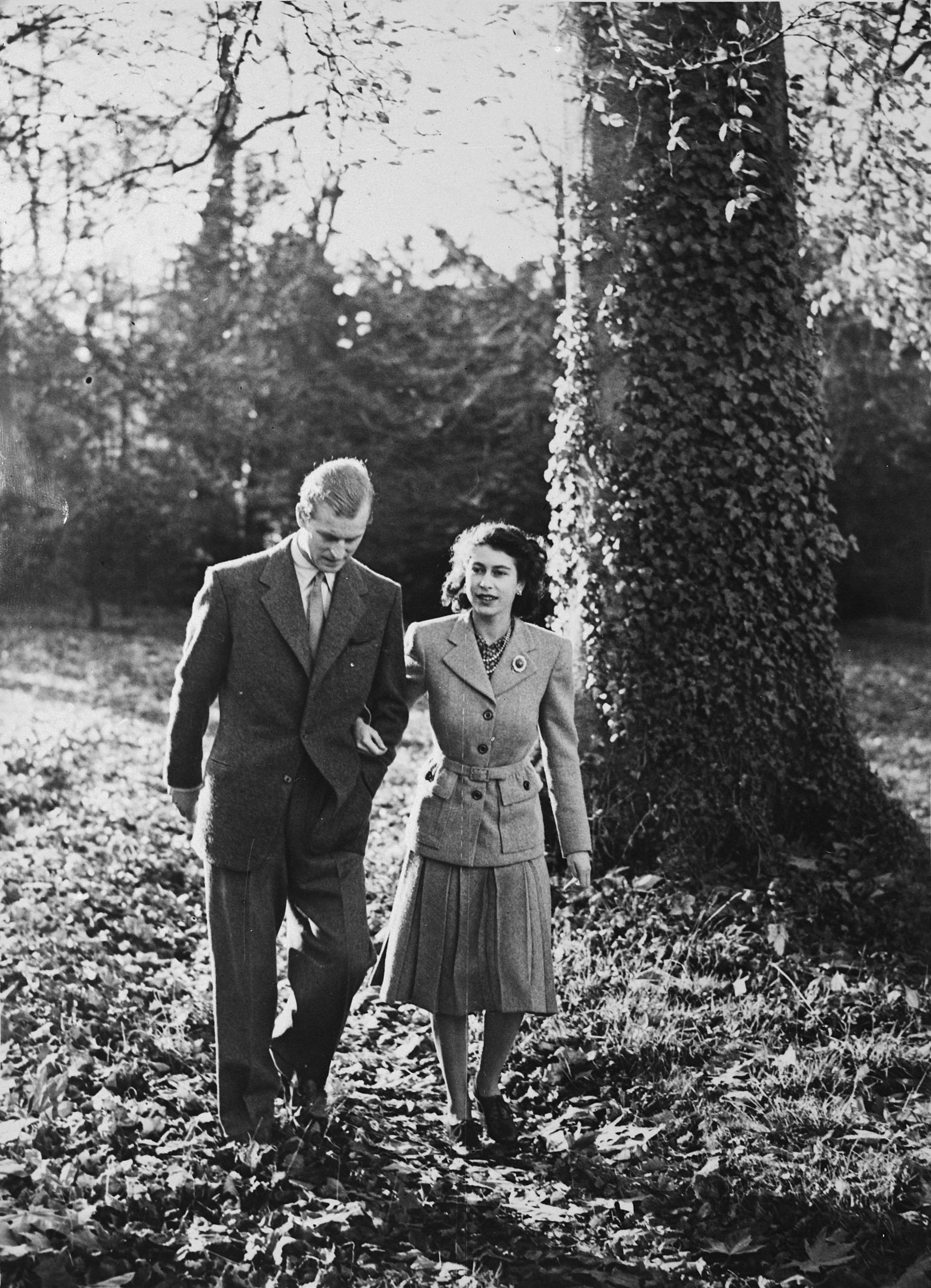
Elizabeth and Philip on their honeymoon

The couple boarded a train to Hampshire at London Waterloo railway station, and spent their wedding night at the home of the Duke of Edinburgh's uncle, the Earl Mountbatten of Burma, in Broadlands. From there the couple travelled to Birkhall on the Balmoral Estate, where they spent the remainder of their honeymoon.

For her going-away outfit, Elizabeth wore "a dress and matching coat in mist-blue with mushroom-coloured accessories" that was designed by Hartnell.
