= James Elphinstone, 18th Lord Elphinstone =

British peer (1953-1994)

The Right Honourable The Lord Elphinstone AssocRICS

Personal details
- Born: James Alexander Elphinstone; 22 April 1953
- Died: 19 December 1994 (aged 41)
- Spouse: Willa Chetwode (m. 1978)
- Children: 4, including Alexander Elphinstone, 19th Lord Elphinstone
- Parents: Rev. Hon. Andrew Elphinstone; Jean Hambro
- Education: Eton College; Royal Agricultural College

James Alexander Elphinstone, 18th Lord Elphinstone and 4th Baron Elphinstone, AssocRICS (22 April 1953 – 19 December 1994), was a British nobleman, farmer, and financier.

== Early life and family ==
Lord Elphinstone was the son of Rev. Hon. Andrew Charles Victor Elphinstone and Jean Frances Hambro. His paternal grandparents were Sidney Buller-Fullerton-Elphinstone, 16th Lord Elphinstone, and the former Lady Mary Bowes-Lyon, elder sister of Queen Elizabeth The Queen Mother.

He was educated at Eton College and the Royal Agricultural College.

He was a Professional Associate of the Royal Institution of Chartered Surveyors.

== Personal life ==
On 22 April 1978, Lord Elphinstone married Willa Mary Gabrielle Chetwode, daughter of Major George David Chetwode and Lady Willa Elliot-Murray-Kynynmound (herself the daughter of Victor Elliot-Murray-Kynynmound, 5th Earl of Minto, and his wife, Marion Cook). The couple had four children:

- Alexander Mountstuart Elphinstone, 19th Lord Elphinstone (b. 15 April 1980); married Nicola J. Hall on 7 July 2007. They have three children.
  - The Honourable Isla Elizabeth Elphinstone (29 December 2008)
  - Jago Alexander Elphinstone, Master of Elphinstone (19 August 2011)
  - The Honourable Rafe Mountstuart Elphinstone (22 January 2015)
- The Honourable Angus John Elphinstone (b. 1982) married Isobel L. Smith on 15 June 2013. They have three children:
  - Albie James Elphinstone (6 August 2015)
  - Edie Dree Elphinstone (11 September 2018)
  - Sienna Grace Elphinstone (23 February 2021)
- The Honourable Fergus David Elphinstone (b. 1985) married Rosie Davies in 2016. They have three children.
  - Hamish Frederick Elphinstone (2017)
  - Flora Sally Elphinstone (2018)
  - Willa Rose Elphinstone (2022)
- The Honourable Clementina Rose Elphinstone (b. 1989) married Oliver William Salusbury Harrison on 30 October 2020. They have two children.
  - Tallulah Willa Harrison (2021)
  - Hector James Salusbury Harrison (2023)

He was succeeded in his titles by his eldest son, Alexander.

Peerage of Scotland
Preceded by John Elphinstone	Lord Elphinstone; 1975–1994	Succeeded by Alexander Elphinstone
Peerage of the United Kingdom
Preceded by John Elphinstone	Baron Elphinstone; 1975–1994; Member of the House of Lords (1975–1994)	Succeeded by Alexander Elphinstone
