= Alexander Elphinstone, 19th Lord Elphinstone =

British peer

The Right Honourable The Lord Elphinstone

Member of the House of Lords (Note: As Baron Elphinstone.)
- Lord Temporal
- In office 19 December 1994 – 11 November 1999
- Preceded by: The 18th Lord Elphinstone
- Succeeded by: Seat abolished (Note: Pursuant to the House of Lords Act 1999.)

Personal details
- Born: Alexander Mountstuart Elphinstone; 15 April 1980 (age 46)
- Party: Crossbencher
- Spouse: Nicola Hall (m. 2007)
- Children: 3
- Parents: James Elphinstone, 18th Lord Elphinstone; Willa Chetwode
- Relatives: Mary Elphinstone, Lady Elphinstone (great-grandmother); Claude Bowes-Lyon, 14th Earl of Strathmore and Kinghorne (great-great-grandfather); Queen Elizabeth The Queen Mother (great-grandaunt)
- Education: Belhaven Hill School; Eton College; Newcastle University (BSc); SOAS, University of London

Alexander Mountstuart Elphinstone, 19th Lord Elphinstone, 5th Baron Elphinstone (born 15 April 1980), is a Scottish peer in both the Peerage of Scotland and the Peerage of the United Kingdom.

== Early life and family ==
Lord Elphinstone is the son of James Elphinstone, 18th Lord Elphinstone, and Willa Mary Gabrielle Chetwode. His mother is the daughter of Major George Chetwode and Lady Willa Elliot-Murray-Kynynmound, daughter of Victor Elliot-Murray-Kynynmound, 5th Earl of Minto.

He is a great-great-grandson of the 14th Earl of Strathmore and Kinghorne and a great-grandnephew of Queen Elizabeth The Queen Mother. Lord Elphinstone's paternal grandfather, Rev. Hon. Andrew Elphinstone, was a first cousin of Elizabeth II through his mother, the former Lady Mary Bowes-Lyon, who was an elder sister of Queen Elizabeth The Queen Mother.

He was educated at Belhaven Hill School, Eton College, Newcastle University (BSc), and the SOAS University of London.

== Personal life ==
He married Nicola J. Hall on 7 July 2007 at Holy Trinity Church, Penn, in Buckinghamshire. The couple have three children.

== Notes ==
Peerage of Scotland
| Preceded by James Elphinstone | Lord Elphinstone; 1994–present | Incumbent; Heir apparent: Hon. Jago Elphinstone |
Peerage of the United Kingdom
| Preceded by James Elphinstone | Baron Elphinstone; 1994–present Member of the House of Lords (1994–1999) | Incumbent; Heir apparent: Hon. Jago Elphinstone |
