= Lord Elphinstone =

Scottish title

Lordship of Elphinstone
- Blazon: Quarterly: 1st grand quarter: Argent a Chevron Sable between three Boars' Heads erased Gules armed of the field and langued Azure (Elphinstone); 2nd grand quarter: quarterly, 1st, Gules a Chevron within a Double Tressure flory counterflory Argent (Fleming); 2nd, Azure three Frases Argent (Fraser); 3rd, Argent on a Chief Gules three Pallets Or (Keith); 4th, Or three Bars wavy Gules (Drummond); 3rd grand quarter: Argent a Chevron between three Otters' Heads erased Gules within a Bordure of the last (Fullerton); 4th grand quarter: Sable on a Cross Argent square pierced of the field four Eagles displayed of the first in the dexter canton an Arm embowed proper issuing out of a Naval Crown the hand holding a Trident Or (Buller)
- Creation date: 14 January 1510
- Peerage: Peerage of Scotland
- First holder: Alexander Elphinstone, 1st Lord Elphinstone
- Present holder: Alexander Mountstuart Elphinstone, 19th Lord Elphinstone, 5th Baron Elphinstone
- Heir apparent: the Hon. Jago Alexander Elphinstone, Master of Elphinstone
- Subsidiary titles: Baron Elphinstone
- Seat: Whitberry House
- Motto: Cause Causit (Scots)

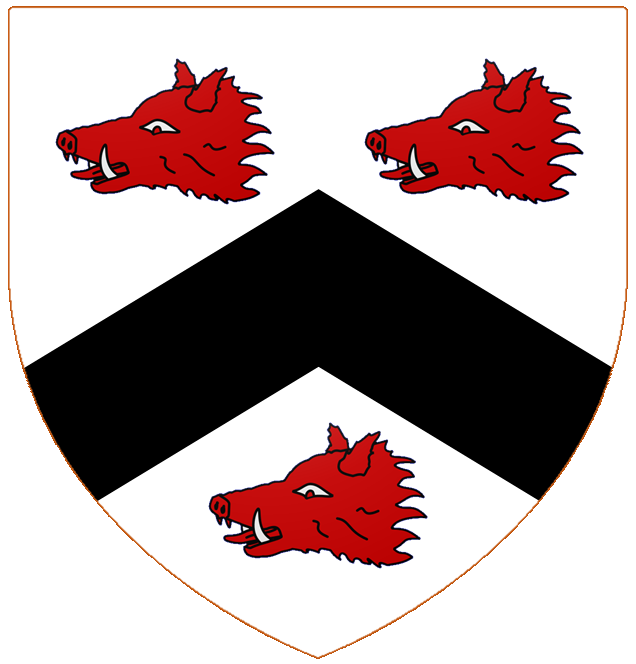
Original arms of the Lords Elphinstone (not including the various quarterings that were later acquired by the family)

Lord Elphinstone is a title in the Peerage of Scotland created by King James IV in 1510.

== History ==
The title of Lord Elphinstone was granted by King James IV in 1510 to Sir Alexander Elphinstone of Elphinstone, who was killed at the Battle of Flodden three years later. He was succeeded by his son, the second Lord, killed at the Battle of Pinkie Cleugh in 1547. His grandson, the fourth Lord, served as Lord High Treasurer of Scotland. His great-great-great-great-grandson, the eleventh Lord, sat in the House of Lords as a Scottish representative peer from 1778 to 1794. He was succeeded by his son, the twelfth Lord, who was a Lieutenant-General in the Army, a Scottish Representative Peer from 1803 to 1807 and Lord Lieutenant of Dunbartonshire.

His son, the thirteenth Lord, served as a Scottish Representative Peer from 1833 to 1834 and from 1847 to 1849, and he was also Governor of Bombay and of Madras. In 1859, he was created Baron Elphinstone, of Elphinstone in the County of Stirling, in the Peerage of the United Kingdom. However, this title became extinct on his death in 1860 while he was succeeded in the lordship by his first cousin, the fourteenth Lord. He was the son of Admiral the Hon. Charles Elphinstone Fleeming, second son of the eleventh Lord.

When he died the following year, this line of the family also failed and he was succeeded by his second cousin, the fifteenth Lord. He was the grandson of the Hon. William Elphinstone, third son of the tenth Lord. Lord Elphinstone sat in the House of Lords as a Scottish Representative Peer from 1867 to 1885 and served as a Lord-in-waiting (government whip in the House of Lords) in the Conservative administrations of Benjamin Disraeli and Lord Salisbury. In 1885, he was created Baron Elphinstone, of Elphinstone in the County of Haddington, in the Peerage of the United Kingdom. The Lords Elphinstone sat in the House of Lords in right of this title until the passing of the House of Lords Act 1999 removed the automatic right of hereditary peers to sit in the upper chamber of Parliament.

He was succeeded by his son, the sixteenth Lord, who in 1910 married Lady Mary Bowes-Lyon, second daughter of Claude Bowes-Lyon, 14th Earl of Strathmore and Kinghorne, and elder sister of Queen Elizabeth The Queen Mother, wife of King George VI and mother of Queen Elizabeth II. He was succeeded by his son, the seventeenth Lord, who was taken Prisoner of War on 12 June 1940. Between 1944 and 1945, he was one of the 'Prominente' prisoners at Colditz Castle (Oflag IV-C). On his death in 1975, the titles passed to his nephew, the eighteenth Lord.

As of 2022, the titles are held by the latter's son, the nineteenth Lord, who succeeded in 1994 at the age of fourteen. He is Chief of Clan Elphinstone. Lord Elphinstone is a third cousin of the Prince of Wales.

Other members of the Elphinstone family include James Elphinstone, 1st Lord Balmerino, younger son of the third Lord Elphinstone. Lord Balmerino's younger son was James Elphinstone, 1st Lord Coupar. Another member was George Keith Elphinstone, 1st Viscount Keith, who was the fifth son of the tenth Lord Elphinstone. Lord Keith's daughter Margaret Keith, 2nd Baroness Keith (who had succeeded to the two baronies of Keith held by her father according to special remainders in the letters patent), inherited the Lordship of Nairne in 1837, a title which is now held by the Viscount Mersey.

The family seat is Whitberry House near Tyninghame, East Lothian.

== Lords Elphinstone (1510); Barons Elphinstone (1885) ==
- Alexander Elphinstone, 1st Lord Elphinstone (d. 1513)
- Alexander Elphinstone, 2nd Lord Elphinstone (1510–1547)
- Robert Elphinstone, 3rd Lord Elphinstone (1530–1602)
- Alexander Elphinstone, 4th Lord Elphinstone (1552–1638)
- Alexander Elphinstone, 5th Lord Elphinstone (1577–1648)
- Alexander Elphinstone, 6th Lord Elphinstone (1620–1654)
- Alexander Elphinstone, 7th Lord Elphinstone (1647–1669)
- John Elphinstone, 8th Lord Elphinstone (1649–1718)
- Charles Elphinstone, 9th Lord Elphinstone (1676–1757)
- Charles Elphinstone, 10th Lord Elphinstone (1711–1781)
- John Elphinstone, 11th Lord Elphinstone (1737–1794)
- John Elphinstone, 12th Lord Elphinstone (1764–1813)
- John Elphinstone, 13th Lord Elphinstone (1807–1860)
- John Elphinstone, 14th Lord Elphinstone (1819–1861)
- William Buller Fullerton Elphinstone, 15th Lord Elphinstone, 1st Baron Elphinstone (1828–1893)
- Sidney Herbert Elphinstone, 16th Lord Elphinstone, 2nd Baron Elphinstone (1869–1955)
- John Alexander Elphinstone, 17th Lord Elphinstone, 3rd Baron Elphinstone (1914–1975)
- James Alexander Elphinstone, 18th Lord Elphinstone, 4th Baron Elphinstone (1953–1994)
- Alexander Mountstuart Elphinstone, 19th Lord Elphinstone, 5th Baron Elphinstone (b. 1980)

== Arms ==
Coat of arms of Lord Elphinstone
Crest A Lady from the waist upwards richly habited Gules her arms extended the right hand supporting a Tower and the left holding a Branch of Laurel all proper. Escutcheon Quarterly: 1st grand quarter: Argent a Chevron Sable between three Boars' Heads erased Gules armed of the field and langued Azure (Elphinstone); 2nd grand quarter: quarterly, 1st, Gules a Chevron within a Double Tressure flory counterflory Argent (Fleming); 2nd, Azure three Frases Argent (Fraser); 3rd, Argent on a Chief Gules three Pallets Or (Keith); 4th, Or three Bars wavy Gules (Drummond); 3rd grand quarter: Argent a Chevron between three Otters' Heads erased Gules within a Bordure of the last (Fullerton); 4th grand quarter: Sable on a Cross Argent square pierced of the field four Eagles displayed of the first in the dexter canton an Arm embowed proper issuing out of a Naval Crown the hand holding a Trident Or (Buller). Supporters On either side a Wild Man wreathed about the temples and loins with Laurel and holding on the exterior shoulder a Club proper. Motto Cause Causit (Cause caused it).

== See also ==
- Clan Elphinstone
- Elphinstone baronets
- Lord Balmerinoch
- Lord Coupar
- Lord Nairne
- William Elphinstone, Lord Elphinstone, a senator of the College of Justice, 1637
