= Victor Elliot-Murray-Kynynmound, 5th Earl of Minto =

British peer (1891-1975)

The Right Honourable The Earl of Minto
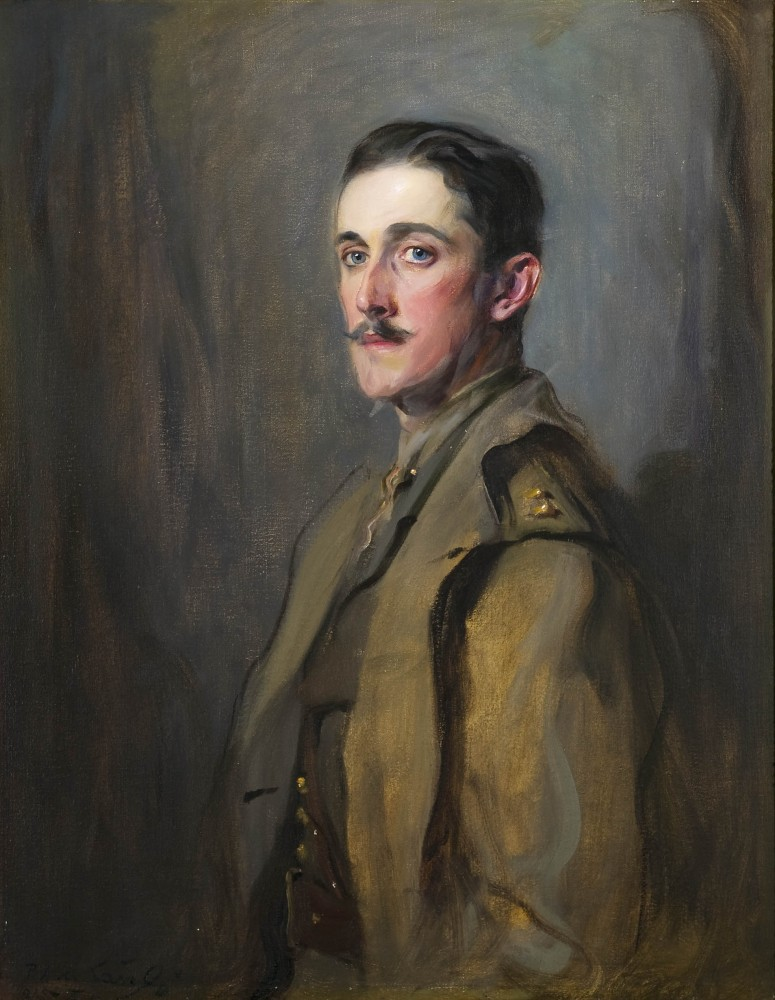
- Portrait by Philip de László, 1915
- Born: Victor Gilbert Lariston Garnet Elliot-Murray-Kynynmound; 12 February 1891
- Died: 11 January 1975 (aged 83)
- Spouse: Marion Cook (m. 1921)
- Children: 4
- Parents: Gilbert Elliot-Murray-Kynynmound (father); Mary Caroline Grey (mother)
- Relatives: Gilbert Elliot-Murray-Kynynmound (son); George Chetwode (son-in-law); Charles Grey (maternal grandfather); Violet Astor (sister); William Elliot-Murray-Kynynmound (paternal grandfather)
- Military career
- Allegiance: United Kingdom
- Branch: British Army
- Service years: 1914-1918
- Conflicts: World War I

Victor Gilbert Lariston Garnet Elliot-Murray-Kynynmound, 5th Earl of Minto (/kɪˈnɪnmənd/; 12 February 1891 – 11 January 1975), was a member of the British nobility.

== Early life ==
He was the son of Gilbert John Elliot-Murray-Kynynmound, 4th Earl of Minto, who served as Governor General of Canada and Viceroy and Governor-General of India, and Lady Mary Caroline Grey. Among his siblings were Lady Eileen Elliot (who married Lord Francis Scott, a son of the 6th Duke of Buccleuch) Lady Ruby Elliot (who married Rowland Baring, 2nd Earl of Cromer), Lady Violet Mary Elliot (who married Lord Charles Petty-Fitzmaurice, and John Astor, 1st Baron Astor of Hever), and Hon. Gavin William Esmond Elliot (who was killed in action in 1917).

His paternal grandparents were William Elliot-Murray-Kynynmound, 3rd Earl of Minto, and the former Emma Hislop (a daughter of General Sir Thomas Hislop, 1st Baronet). His maternal grandparents were Charles Grey and the former Caroline Eliza Farquhar. Among his extended maternal family was uncle, Albert Grey, 4th Earl Grey, and aunts Sybil Beauclerk, Duchess of St Albans, Louisa McDonnell, Countess of Antrim and Lady Victoria Dawnay.

== Personal life ==
On 19 January 1921 in Montreal, Quebec, Canada, Lord Minto married Marion Cook. A native of Morrisburg, Ontario, she was a daughter of George William Cook. Together, they were the parents of:

- Lady Bridget Elliot (1921–2005)
- Lady Willa Elliot (1924–2010), who married Maj. George Chetwode, the son of Admiral Sir George Chetwode, in 1946.
- Gilbert Edward George Lariston Elliot-Murray-Kynynmound, 6th Earl of Minto (1928–2005), who married Lady Caroline Child-Villiers, a daughter of George Child Villiers, 9th Earl of Jersey.
- Hon. George Esmond Dominic Elliot (1931–2018), who married Countess Marie-Anna "Bunny" Esterhazy, in 1962. They divorced in 1972.

The Countess of Minto, officiated at the unveiling of Morrisburg's World War I monument in September 1923. Lord Minto died in 1975.

=== Art theft ===
In 1930, a portrait of the 1st Countess of Minto (Anna Maria (Amjand), Lady Gilbert Elliot) was stolen from the private art collection of the 5th Earl of Minto. The portrait of the Countess, which was completed by Sir Joshua Reynolds, and was part of his 1787 Exhibition, was not recovered.

=== Descendants ===
Through his daughter, Lady Willa Chetwode, he was a grandfather of Willa Chetwode, who married James Elphinstone, 18th Lord Elphinstone (a grandson of the former Lady Mary Bowes-Lyon and grandnephew of Queen Elizabeth The Queen Mother). Lady Willa's grandson is Alexander Elphinstone, 19th Lord Elphinstone.

== Arms ==
Coat of arms of Victor Elliot-Murray-Kynynmound, 5th Earl of Minto
Crest A dexter arm embowed issuant from clouds, throwing a dart, all proper.. Escutcheon Quarterly : 1st and 4th grand quarters, quarterly; 1st and 4th, argent, a hunting-horn sable, stringed gules, in the dexter chief point a crescent of the last; on a chief wavy azure, three mullets of the field (Murray of Melgund); 2nd and 3rd, azure, a chevron argent, between three fleurs-de-lis or (Kynynmound of that ilk); 2nd and 3rd grand quarters, gules, on a bend engrailed or, a baton azure, within a bordure vair (Elliot, of Minto); over all, a chief of augmentation argent, charged with a Moor's head couped in profile proper., being the arms of Corsica. Supporters Dexter, an Indian sheep, sinister, a fawn, all proper. Motto Non eget arcu (He needs not the bow); Below: Suaviter et fortiter (Mildy and firmly).

Peerage of the United Kingdom
Preceded by Gilbert Elliot-Murray-Kynynmound	Earl of Minto; 1914–1975	Succeeded by Gilbert Edward George Lariston Elliot-Murray-Kynynmound
