= Gabriel Tschumi =

Swiss chef (1882–1957)

Gabriel Tschumi (23 October 1882 –27 April 1957) was a native of Wiedlisbach, Switzerland, who served as master chef to three British monarchs: Queen Victoria and Kings Edward VII and George V.

== Early life ==
Tschumi was born 23 October 1882, in Moudon, Switzerland, where his father was a professor of languages; his father was killed in an accident some days after his birth. At the age of 16 in 1899, he was appointed a cook's apprentice in the kitchens of the Royal Household through the good offices of his cousin, Louise Tschumi, who was at the time one of Queen Victoria’s dressers.

== Career ==
Recalling his arrival at Buckingham Palace to start as a kitchen apprentice, Tschumi described the royal chef M. Menager (equivalent to chef de cuisine in a restaurant at the time), who had eighteen chefs working under him, eight of whom had their own tables in different parts of the kitchen. "These, I found out, were the master cooks, some of whom one day might rise to the position of chef, with large staffs of their own, In the meantime they worked under M. Menager's supervision [...] assisted by the heads of other sections, the two pastry cooks, two roast cooks, bakers, confectioners' chefs and two larder cooks. Then, in diminishing order of importance, came two assistant chefs, eight kitchen maids, six scullery maids, six scourers, and finally the four apprentices."

Tschumi was successively promoted to Second Assistant Cook in 1905, Assistant Cook in 1906; Sixth Chief Cook in 1911; and Fifth Chief Cook 1918–19. When he received his Long and Faithful Service Medal in 1930, he was Third Chef. Tschumi helped to prepare meals for grand occasions. On the menu for dinner at Balmoral on 9 October 1900, was a sideboard of hot and cold chicken, boiled tongue and cold roast beef, vegetable soup, pheasant consommé with quenelles (dumplings, possibly lobster), cod, ham with cucumber, braised cabbage, stuffed turkey, haricot beans and Brussels sprouts.

Edward VII's 1902 coronation banquet included sole poached in Chablis garnished with oysters and prawns, a quail and a third of "a very plump" roasting chicken (per person), asparagus with Hollandaise, roast beef, snipe cutlets, a soufflé Parmesan, and a strawberry dessert that took three days to assemble. The 250 guests were each given a handmade sugar crown as a table favor.

Tschumi was also responsible for the wedding breakfast for the Duke and Duchess of York on April 26, 1923, featuring: Consommé à la Windsor, Suprèmes de Saumon Reine Mary, Côtelettes d’Agneau Prince Albert, Chapons à la Strathmore and Fraises Duchesse Elizabeth.

Members of the royal family insisted on using an affectionate Anglicized version of his last name, uniformly calling him ‘Chummy’.

== After royal service ==
Tschumi retired from royal service on 1 July 1932, and upon his retirement was awarded the Royal Victorian Medal in Silver. He thereafter worked for the Duke of Portland at Welbeck Abbey, as Chef from 1 July 1933. There, Tschumi and his wife had pleasant quarters, Mrs. Tschumi's father having been Head Keeper at Windsor Great Park under Queen Victoria, and having completed almost 50 years' service. Tschumi remained with the Duke of Portland until the Duke's death in 1943, and thereafter helped the new Duke and Duchess, and the Dowager Duchess, for 5 or 6 months of each year. In August 1946 he was asked to assist for six weeks at Sandringham House in Queen Mary's household; and as a result of this, in October 1947 he was invited to become Chef to Queen Mary at Marlborough House, which he did formally from January 1948 until October 1952, when he retired due to ill health.

A favorite of Queen Mary was this simple recipe for "Queen Mary's Cheese Biscuits" created by Chef Tschumi: "Take four oz. of grated parmesan cheese, 4 oz. of butter and 4 oz. of flour and mix into a paste on a board. Roll out thin, cut into shapes and bake on a greased tray in a medium oven for about 20 minutes. They should not be allowed to brown too greatly. At Marlborough House they were always stamped out with a round or oblong biscuit-cutter."

== Later years ==
In retirement, Tschumi went to live in Wimbledon where he wrote his memoirs, entitled Royal Chef: Recollections of a Life in Royal Households from Queen Victoria to Queen Mary, which was published in 1954. Gabriel ‘Chummy’ Tschumi died on 27 April 1957.
