= Gilbert Elliot-Murray-Kynynmound, 6th Earl of Minto =

Scottish nobleman

The Right Honourable The Earl of Minto OBE, DL
- Coat of arms
- Tenure: 11 January 1975 – 7 September 2005
- Predecessor: Victor Elliot-Murray-Kynynmound, 5th Earl
- Successor: Timothy Elliot-Murray-Kynynmound, 7th Earl
- Other titles: Viscount Melgund (until 1975)
- Born: 19 June 1928
- Died: 7 September 2005 (aged 77)
- Buried: 12 September 2005; Minto Parish Church
- Spouses: Caroline Child-Villiers (m. 1952; div. 1965) Mary Elizabeth Ballantine (m. 1965; died 1983) Caroline Larlham, née Godfrey (m. 1991)
- Issue Detail: Timothy Elliot-Murray-Kynynmound; Laura Elliot-Murray-Kynynmound
- Father: Victor Elliot-Murray-Kynynmound, 5th Earl of Minto
- Mother: Marion Cook
- Occupation: Politician

Gilbert Edward George Lariston Elliot-Murray-Kynynmound, 6th Earl of Minto, OBE, DL (/kɪˈnɪnmənd/; 19 June 1928 – 7 September 2005) (nicknamed "Gibbie"), styled Viscount Melgund until 1975, was a Scottish peer.

== Background and life ==
Lord Minto was the son of the 5th Earl of Minto, and his wife, Marion Cook.

He attended Eton and the Royal Military Academy at Sandhurst, and served in the Scots Guards until 1958. In the 1955 Birthday Honours he was appointed a Member of the Order of the British Empire (MBE). He was an honorary lieutenant of the Royal Company of Archers (Queen's Bodyguard in Scotland). He served as a Justice of the Peace for Roxburghshire from 1961 onwards. He succeeded his father as Earl in 1975. He served as president of the South of Scotland Chamber of Commerce from 1980 to 1982, chair of the Scottish Council on Alcoholism (1973-1987), and a commissioner of the Local Government Property Commission (Scotland) from 1995-1998.

The Earl was appointed Officer of the Order of the British Empire (OBE) in the 1986 Birthday Honours. He was Vice Lord Lieutenant of Roxburgh, Ettrick and Lauderdale.

In 1992, Minto House, the traditional family seat near the village of Minto but not occupied by the family since before the Second World War, was demolished in accordance with the Earl's wishes, despite it being a listed building. Minto House was listed as Category A, and largely demolished within weeks. The Earl was at that time convenor of the Borders Regional Council, which held regulatory jurisdiction over such actions.

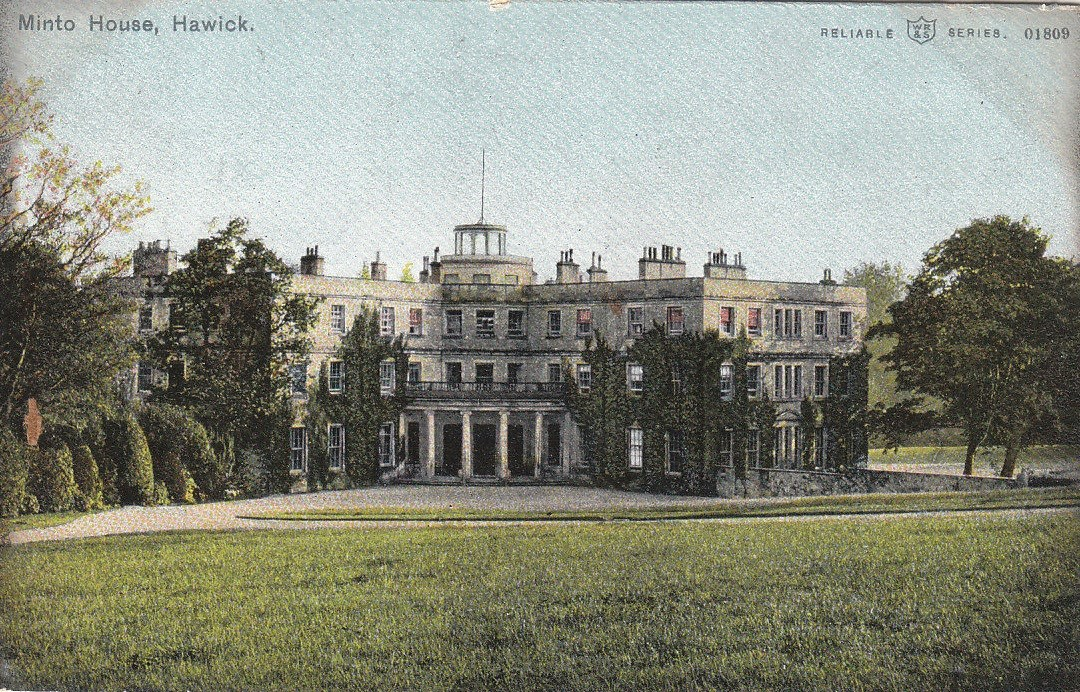
Minto House (Minto, Scottish Borders) circa 1910 - demolished 1992

== Family ==
Lord Minto (then Lord Melgund) married Lady Caroline Child-Villiers (born 9 April 1934), daughter of George Child Villiers, 9th Earl of Jersey and Patricia Kenneth Richards, on 26 November 1952. They had two children:

- Timothy Elliot-Murray-Kynynmound, 7th Earl of Minto [formerly Viscount Melgund] (born 1 December 1953); who is married and has three surviving children.
- Lady Laura Elliot-Murray-Kynynmound (born 11 March 1956) who married in 1984, John Reginald David Palmer, son of William Palmer, and has issue, two sons.

Lord and Lady Melgund were divorced in 1965. In 1965 Lord Minto married, secondly, Mary Elizabeth Ballantine (29 December 1936 — 24 January 1983), daughter of Peter Ballantine, of Stonehouse Farm, Gladstone, New Jersey, United States. The marriage lasted until her death in 1983. He married, thirdly, in 1991 (divorced 2004) to Mrs Caroline Larlham, née Godfrey (b. 1952).

== Death ==
Lord Minto died after a fall, and due to severe lung disease that rendered an operation impossible, at the age of 77 in a nursing home. His funeral took place on Monday, 12 September 2005 at Minto Parish Church, near Hawick, Scottish Borders. His estate has been the subject of a dispute between his third wife and his son.

== Arms ==
Coat of arms of Gilbert Elliot-Murray-Kynynmound, 6th Earl of Minto
Crest A dexter arm embowed issuant from clouds, throwing a dart, all proper.. Escutcheon Quarterly : 1st and 4th grand quarters, quarterly; 1st and 4th, argent, a hunting-horn sable, stringed gules, in the dexter chief point a crescent of the last; on a chief wavy azure, three mullets of the field (Murray of Melgund); 2nd and 3rd, azure, a chevron argent, between three fleurs-de-lis or (Kynynmound of that ilk); 2nd and 3rd grand quarters, gules, on a bend engrailed or, a baton azure, within a bordure vair (Elliot, of Minto); over all, a chief of augmentation argent, charged with a Moor's head couped in profile proper., being the arms of Corsica. Supporters Dexter, an Indian sheep, sinister, a fawn, all proper. Motto Non eget arcu (He needs not the bow); Below: Suaviter et fortiter (Mildy and firmly).

Peerage of the United Kingdom
Preceded by Victor Elliot-Murray-Kynynmound	Earl of Minto; 1975–2005	Succeeded by Timothy Elliot-Murray-Kynynmound
