= Gilbert Elliot-Murray-Kynynmound, 4th Earl of Minto =

British peer and politician (1845–1914)

His Excellency The Right Honourable The Earl of Minto KG GCSI GCMG GCIE PC
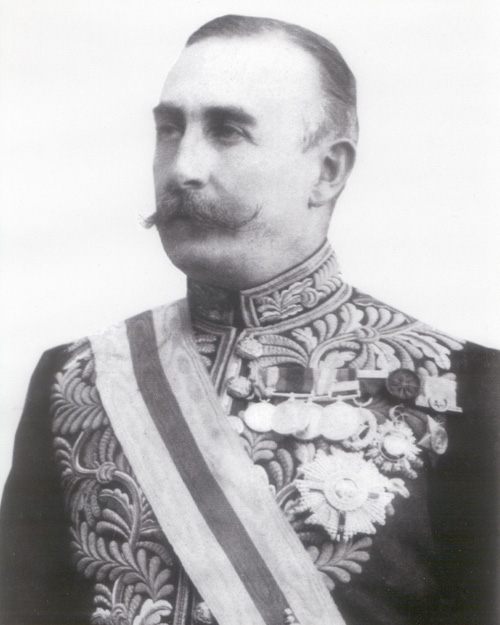

Viceroy and Governor-General of India
- In office 18 November 1905 – 23 November 1910
- Monarchs: Edward VII; George V
- Prime Minister: Arthur Balfour; Henry Campbell-Bannerman; H. H. Asquith
- Preceded by: The Marquess Curzon of Kedleston
- Succeeded by: The Lord Hardinge of Penshurst

Governor General of Canada
- In office 12 November 1898 – 10 December 1904
- Monarchs: Victoria; Edward VII
- Prime Minister: Canadian • Wilfrid Laurier; British • The Marquess of Salisbury • Arthur Balfour
- Preceded by: The Earl of Aberdeen
- Succeeded by: The Earl Grey

Personal details
- Born: 9 July 1845 Mayfair, London, England
- Died: 1 March 1914 (aged 68) Minto, Scottish Borders, Scotland
- Spouse: Mary Caroline Grey (m. 1883)
- Children: 5, including Victor Elliot-Murray-Kynynmound, 5th Earl of Minto
- Parent(s): William Elliot-Murray-Kynynmound, 3rd Earl of Minto; Emma Hislop
- Education: Trinity College, Cambridge

Military service
- Allegiance: United Kingdom
- Branch/service: British Army
- Years of service: 1867–1885
- Rank: Lieutenant; Major
- Unit: Scots Guards; 1st Roxboroughshire Mounted Rifles
- Battles/wars: Second Anglo-Afghan War; Anglo-Egyptian War; Mahdist War; North-West Rebellion

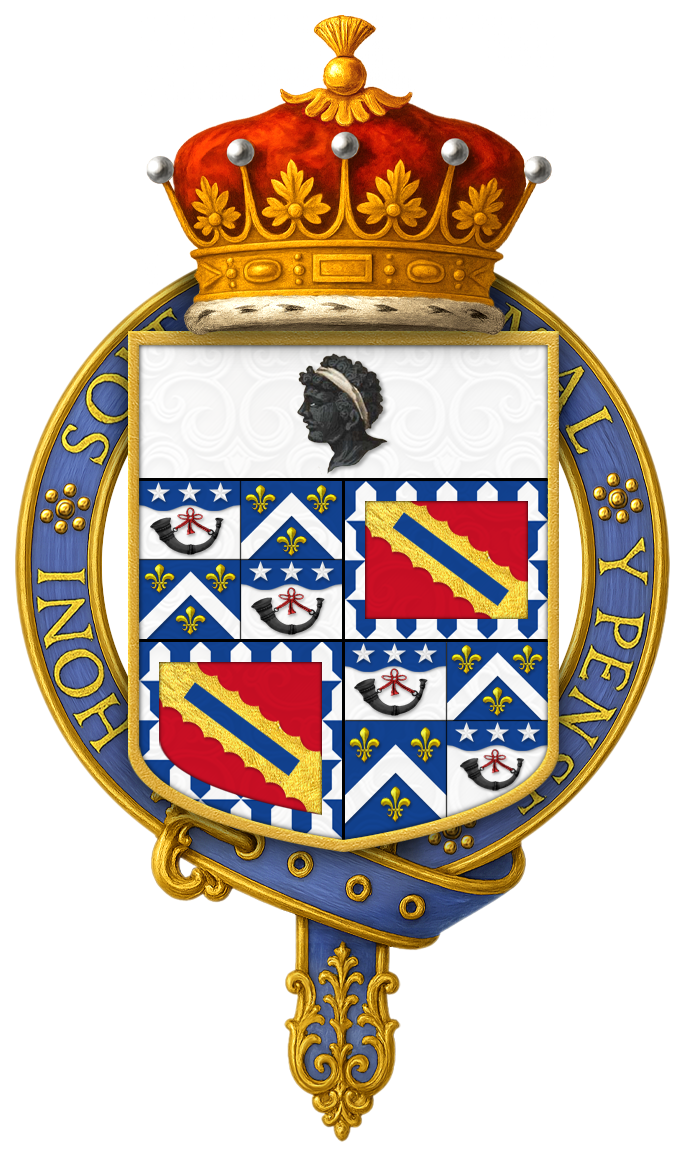
Garter-encircled Shield of Arms of Gilbert Elliot-Murray-Kynynmound, 4th Earl of Minto, KG, GCSI, GCMG, GCIE, PC

Gilbert John Elliot-Murray-Kynynmound, 4th Earl of Minto (/kɪˈnɪnmənd/; 9 July 1845 – 1 March 1914), known as Viscount Melgund by courtesy from 1859 to 1891, was a British peer and politician who served as Governor General of Canada from 1898 to 1904, and Viceroy of India from 1905 to 1910.

== Early life and career ==
Minto was born in London, the son of William Elliot-Murray-Kynynmound, 3rd Earl of Minto, and Emma, daughter of General Sir Thomas Hislop, 1st Baronet. After the death of his grandfather in 1859 he became known by the courtesy title of Viscount Melgund. After completing his education at Eton College and Trinity College, Cambridge, he was commissioned a Lieutenant in the Scots Guards in 1867, but left in 1870. He joined the 1st Roxburghshire Mounted Rifle Volunteer Corps as a captain in 1872. He was a sportsman and won the first Grand Steeple-Chase de Paris in 1874 under the name of 'Mr. Rolly'.

In 1874, in the capacity of a newspaper correspondent, he witnessed the operations of the Carlists in Spain; he took service with the Turkish army in the war with Russia in 1877 and served under Lord Roberts in the second Afghan War (1878–1879), having narrowly escaped accompanying Sir Louis Cavagnari on his fatal mission to Kabul.

He acted as private secretary to Lord Roberts during his mission to the Cape in 1881, and was with the army occupying Egypt in 1882, thus furthering his military career and his experience of colonial administration. He was promoted Major in 1882. He was military secretary to the Marquess of Lansdowne during his governor-generalship of Canada from 1883 to 1885, and lived in Canada with his wife, Mary Caroline Grey, sister of Lord Grey, Governor General from 1904 to 1911, whom he had married in Britain on 28 July 1883. On this first Canadian visit, he was very active in raising a Canadian volunteer force to serve with the British Army in the Sudan Campaign of 1884. He served as Chief of Staff to General Middleton in the Riel Rebellion of 1885. When he was offered command of the North-West Mounted Police, he decided instead to pursue a political career in Britain. On his departure home to Britain, Canadian Prime Minister Sir John A. Macdonald apparently said to him, "I shall not live to see it, but some day Canada will welcome you back as Governor General".

His political aspirations were checked with his defeat in the 1886 general election, where he stood as the Conservative candidate for Hexham. He then applied himself with great enthusiasm to promoting a volunteer army in Britain. In 1888 he was promoted colonel on assuming command of the South of Scotland Brigade. He resigned his commission in 1889. He succeeded to his father's earldom in 1891, becoming The Earl of Minto.

== Governor General of Canada ==
Macdonald's prediction came true when Minto was named Governor General of Canada in the summer of 1898, having campaigned for the post after he learned of the retirement of Lord Aberdeen. Sir Wilfrid Laurier wrote that Lord Minto "took his duties to heart" and a review of his life reveals an energetic man who welcomed many challenges and responsibilities.

Lord Minto's term of office was marked by a period of strong nationalism which saw economic growth coupled with massive immigration to Canada. Relations with the United States were strained as border and fishing disputes continued to create problems between the two countries.

In September 1901, after Queen Victoria's death in January, the Duke and Duchess of Cornwall and York (later to become King George V and Queen Mary) visited Canada, and travelled with Lady Minto to western Canada and the Klondike. Following the tour, Minto recommended Thomas Shaughnessy, President of the Canadian Pacific Railway, to the government at Westminster, via the Secretary of State for the Colonies, for a knighthood, as recognition for his service to the Duke and Duchess of York. Prime Minister Wilfrid Laurier, to whom Shaughnessy was no friend, opposed the idea; but, Minto made the recommendation anyway, invoking the ire of Laurier and prompting the Prime Minister to draft a policy dictating that all Canadian nominees for honours must be approved by the prime minister before the list was sent to London.

On 6 December 1901, Lord Minto held a skating party on the Ottawa River, when Andrew George Blair's daughter Bessie, and potential rescuer Henry Albert Harper both drowned.

Lord Minto, like his predecessors, travelled throughout the young country—he crossed Quebec, Ontario and western Canada, visiting former battlegrounds where he had served during the North-West Rebellion. He rode throughout western Canada with the North-West Mounted Police, and enjoyed the Quebec countryside on horseback.

Lord Minto's convictions about the importance of preserving Canadian heritage led to the creation of the National Archives of Canada.

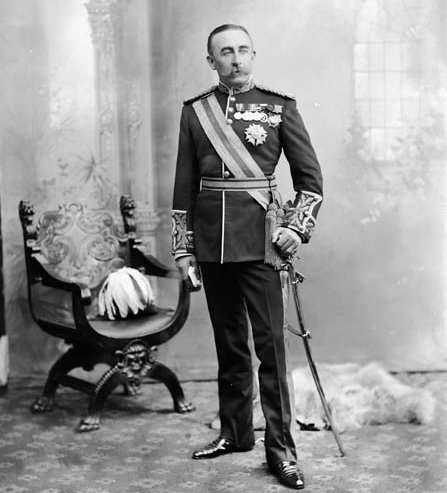
The Earl of Minto as Governor General of Canada.

Lord and Lady Minto were sports enthusiasts and the Minto Skating Club, which they founded in 1903, has produced many famous ice skaters. They both excelled at the sport and hosted many lively skating parties during their time at Rideau Hall. In the summer, the Minto family loved to bicycle and play lacrosse. In 1901, Lord Minto donated the Minto Cup and appointed trustees to oversee its annual awarding to the champion senior men's lacrosse team of Canada (since 1937 the Cup has been awarded to the junior men's champions). He loved the outdoors, championed the conservation of natural resources and promoted the creation of national parks.

In education and health, Lord Minto encouraged a forward-looking approach. He believed that Canada's progress depended on the cultivation of patriotism and unity, and this conviction was reflected in his desire to see a wider history curriculum developed in Canadian schools. In response to the health crisis posed by tuberculosis, he helped establish the first anti-tuberculosis foundation in Canada.

Lord Minto also took great interest in the development of the Canadian military and emphasized the need for training and professional development. He was appointed honorary Lieutenant-Colonel of the Governor General's Foot Guards Regiment on 1 December 1898 and was subsequently appointed Honorary Colonel, a tradition that has continued with the post of Governors General to this day.

He was appointed a Privy Counsellor on 11 August 1902, following an announcement of the King's intention to make this appointment in the 1902 Coronation Honours list published in June.

On his trip back to Britain in 1904, having finished his term as Canada's Governor General, Lord Minto wrote in his journal "... so our life in Canada is over and it has been a great wrench parting from so many friends and leaving a country which I love, and which has been very full of interest to me".

== Viceroy and Governor General of India ==
In 1905, following the resignation of Lord Curzon of Kedleston, Gilbert Elliot-Murray-Kynynmound, 4th Earl of Minto, was appointed Viceroy and Governor-General of India. He served in this role until 1910, following in the footsteps of his great-grandfather, the first Lord Minto. During his tenure, Lord Minto faced significant political challenges and introduced notable reforms.

One of the most significant reforms during his tenure was the Indian Councils Act 1909, commonly known as the Morley-Minto Reforms. These reforms were a collaborative effort between John Morley, the Secretary of State for India, and Lord Minto. The reforms aimed to introduce a limited form of self-governance by expanding the legislative councils and allowing for greater Indian representation. This move was a response to the growing Indian nationalist movement and demands for political participation. John Morley famously argued that “Reforms may not save the Raj, but if they don’t, nothing else will.” In response, Minto expressed his belief in the resilience of British rule, stating, “The Raj will not disappear in India as long as the British race remains what it is, because we shall fight for the Raj as hard as we have ever fought, if it comes to fighting, and we shall win as we have always won.”

Lord Minto’s tenure was also marked by significant political unrest and the rise of revolutionary activities. The Partition of Bengal in 1905, which divided the largely Muslim eastern areas from the largely Hindu western areas, was a particularly controversial decision. This move led to widespread protests and was eventually reversed in 1911. Additionally, on 15 November 1909, two bombs were hurled at Lord Minto and his wife near Raipur Gate of Ahmedabad, although they were not harmed in the attack.

For his lifetime of service, Lord Minto was made a Knight Companion of the Garter. He was succeeded by Lord Hardinge of Penshurst in 1910. The Morley-Minto Reforms laid the groundwork for future constitutional developments in India, representing a step towards greater Indian participation in governance, although they were also criticized for being too limited.

== Marriage ==
He married, on 28 July 1883, Lady Mary Caroline Grey, daughter of Charles Grey and his wife, Caroline Eliza Farquhar. She was the sister of Albert Grey, 4th Earl Grey, Sybil Beauclerk, Duchess of St Albans, Louisa McDonnell, Countess of Antrim, and Lady Victoria Dawnay. They had five children:

- Lady Eileen Nina Evelyn Sibell Elliot (13 December 1884 – 29 May 1938), married Lord Francis Montagu Douglas Scott (son of the 6th Duke of Buccleuch and Lady Louisa Hamilton), and had issue;
- Lady Ruby Florence Mary Elliot (26 September 1886 – 5 November 1961), married Rowland Baring, 2nd Earl of Cromer, and had issue;
- Lady Violet Mary Elliot (28 May 1889 – 3 January 1965), married, firstly, Lord Charles Petty-Fitzmaurice, and had issue, secondly, John Astor, 1st Baron Astor of Hever, and had issue;
- Victor Elliot-Murray-Kynynmound, 5th Earl of Minto (12 February 1891 – 11 January 1975);
- The Honourable Gavin William Esmond Elliot (25 April 1895 – 6 August 1917; killed in action).

== Arms ==
Coat of arms of Gilbert Elliot-Murray-Kynynmound, 4th Earl of Minto
Crest A dexter arm embowed issuant from clouds, throwing a dart, all proper.. Escutcheon Quarterly : 1st and 4th grand quarters, quarterly; 1st and 4th, argent, a hunting-horn sable, stringed gules, in the dexter chief point a crescent of the last; on a chief wavy azure, three mullets of the field (Murray of Melgund); 2nd and 3rd, azure, a chevron argent, between three fleurs-de-lis or (Kynynmound of that ilk); 2nd and 3rd grand quarters, gules, on a bend engrailed or, a baton azure, within a bordure vair (Elliot, of Minto); over all, a chief of augmentation argent, charged with a Moor's head couped in profile proper., being the arms of Corsica. Supporters Dexter, an Indian sheep, sinister, a fawn, all proper. Motto Non eget arcu (He needs not the bow); Below: Suaviter et fortiter (Mildy and firmly). Orders The Most Noble Order of the Garter - Knight Companion (KG).

== Legacy ==
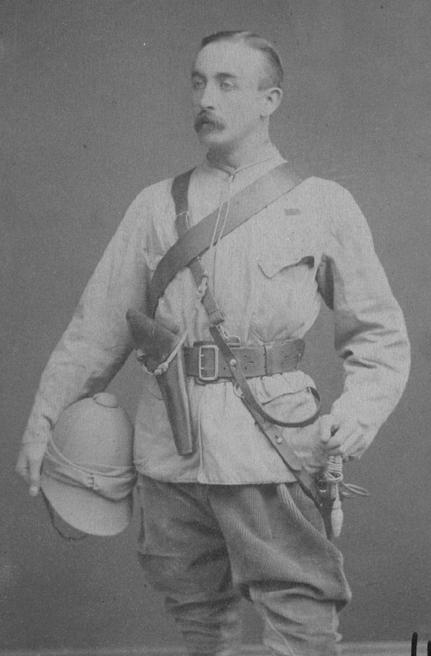
Lord Melgund in 1885, as Middleton's chief of staff

The Earl of Minto's popularity in Canada outlived him. In addition to a Minto Place in Rockcliffe, Ottawa and Minto Street in Vancouver and the SS Minto, a famous steamer on the Arrow Lakes, the gold-mining company town of Minto City in the Bridge River Country, established 1936, was named in honour of the Earl. Also named for the Earl was Mount Minto in the Atlin District of far northern British Columbia, the town of Minto, Ontario. In addition, Minto, New Brunswick, was renamed in memory of him. The Earl of Minto and Lady Minto appeared on the obverse of the Canadian four-dollar bill in the 1900 and 1902 versions of this denomination. Indirectly, the town of Minto, North Dakota, in the United States is named for Minto, Ontario, whence its settlers came.

Minto Park in Kolkata (formerly Calcutta), India, commemorates him. The school from which Aligarh Muslim University evolved was named behind him as Minto Circle after his generous funding for the construction of the new school buildings.

Minto Road, an area where most of the ministers of Bangladesh government have their official residence, is named after Lord Minto.

Minto Hospital and Minto Park (now officially renamed but popularly still known as such) in Lahore were also named after him.

Minto Ophthalmic Hospital in Bangalore is also named after him. It is the oldest eye hospitals in India and one of the largest and busiest eye hospitals in the country.

== See also ==
- Bell Telephone Memorial
- Minto Cup
- Minto Circle
- Minto Eye Hospital
- Minto, Manitoba
- Rural Municipality of Minto

== Notes ==
Government offices
Preceded by The Earl of Aberdeen	Governor General of Canada; 1898–1904	Succeeded by The Earl Grey
Preceded by The Lord Curzon of Kedleston	Viceroy of India; 1905–1910	Succeeded by The Lord Hardinge of Penshurst
Academic offices
Preceded by George Wyndham	Rector of the University of Edinburgh; 1911–1914	Succeeded by Earl Kitchener
Peerage of the United Kingdom
Preceded by William Elliot-Murray-Kynynmound	Earl of Minto; 1891–1914	Succeeded by Victor Elliot-Murray-Kynynmound
