= Sidney Meyrick =

Royal Navy Admiral (1879–1973)

Admiral Sir Sidney Meyrick KCB
- Born: 28 March 1879
- Died: 18 December 1973 (aged 94); Chichester, Sussex, England
- Military career
- Allegiance: United Kingdom
- Branch: Royal Navy
- Service years: 1893–1940
- Rank: Admiral
- Commands: HMS Courageous; 6th Destroyer Flotilla; HMS Revenge; HMS Nelson; 2nd Cruiser Squadron; Naval Secretary; America and West Indies Station
- Conflicts: First World War; Second World War
- Awards: Knight Commander of the Order of the Bath

Admiral Sir Sidney Julius Meyrick KCB (28 March 1879 – 18 December 1973) was a Royal Navy officer who went on to be Commander-in-Chief, America and West Indies Station.

== Naval career ==
Meyrick joined the Royal Navy in 1893. He served in the First World War in HMS Erin and then in HMS Resolution in the Grand Fleet.

After the War he became Flag Captain commanding HMS Courageous and Chief Staff Officer to the Commander-in-Chief of the Reserve Fleet in 1920 and then moved on to be Commander of the 6th Destroyer Flotilla in 1921. He was made Flag Captain commanding HMS Revenge and Chief Staff Officer to the Commander-in-Chief of the Atlantic Fleet in 1922.

He joined the Staff of the Royal Naval College, Greenwich, in 1923 and became Director of Training and Staff Duties at the Admiralty in 1926. He was appointed Flag Captain commanding HMS Nelson and Captain of the Fleet to the Commander-in-Chief of the Atlantic Fleet in 1927 before becoming Captain of the Royal Naval College, Dartmouth in 1929 and Naval Secretary in 1932. He was then made Commander of the 2nd Cruiser Squadron in 1934 and Commander-in-Chief, America and West Indies Station in 1937.

At the start of the Second World War, formations under Meyrick's command as Commander-in-Chief, America and West Indies Station, included the 8th Cruiser Squadron and two escort ships. In 1940 he was credited with forcing the Captain of the German liner Columbus to scuttle his ship. He retired in 1940.

He died at the family home and estate, Norton House, near Chichester in Sussex.

== Family ==
In 1901 he married Judith Fullerton, the daughter of Admiral Sir John Fullerton; they had three sons, named Timothy, Michael and Peter.

Military offices
Preceded by George Chetwode	Naval Secretary; 1932–1934	Succeeded by Guy Royle
Preceded by Sir Matthew Best	Commander-in-Chief, America and West Indies Station; 1937–1940	Succeeded by Sir Charles Kennedy-Purvis
