= Sidney Elphinstone, 16th Lord Elphinstone =

British nobleman (1869–1955)

The Right Honourable The Lord Elphinstone KT, FRSE, FRSGS
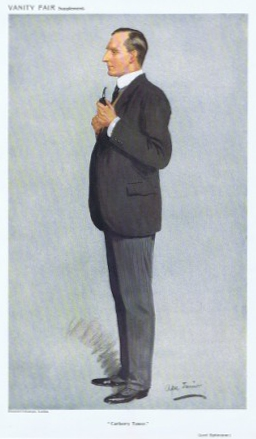
- Elphinstone as caricatured in Vanity Fair in May 1911.
- Born: Sidney Herbert Elphinstone; 27 July 1869; Carberry Tower, East Lothian, Scotland
- Died: 28 November 1955 (aged 86)
- Education: Marlborough College
- Title: 16th Lord Elphinstone
- Spouse: Lady Mary Bowes-Lyon (m. 1910)
- Children: Hon. Mary Elphinstone; John Elphinstone, 17th Lord Elphinstone; Hon. Jean Wills; Hon. Andrew Elphinstone; Hon. Margaret Rhodes
- Parents: William, Lord Elphinstone (father); Lady Constance Murray (mother)

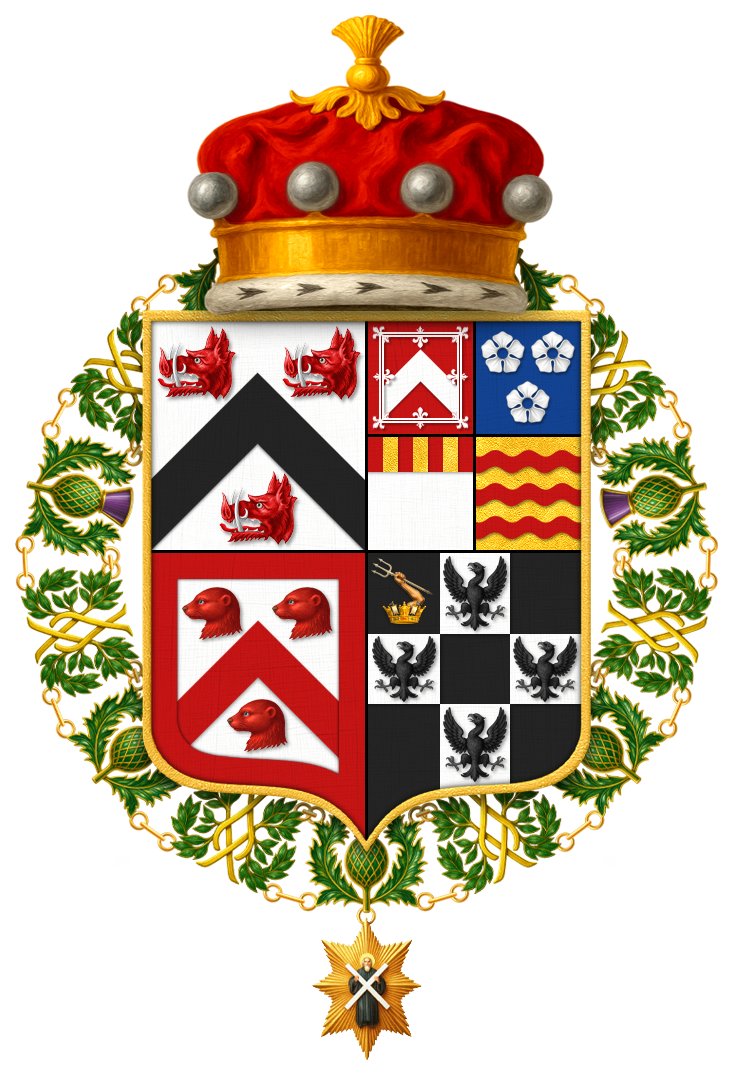
Shield of Arms of Sidney Herbert Elphinstone, 16th Lord Elphinstone, 2nd Baron Elphinstone, KT, FRSE, FRSGS

Sidney Herbert Elphinstone, 16th Lord Elphinstone and 2nd Baron Elphinstone (27 July 1869 – 28 November 1955) was a British nobleman.

== Early life ==
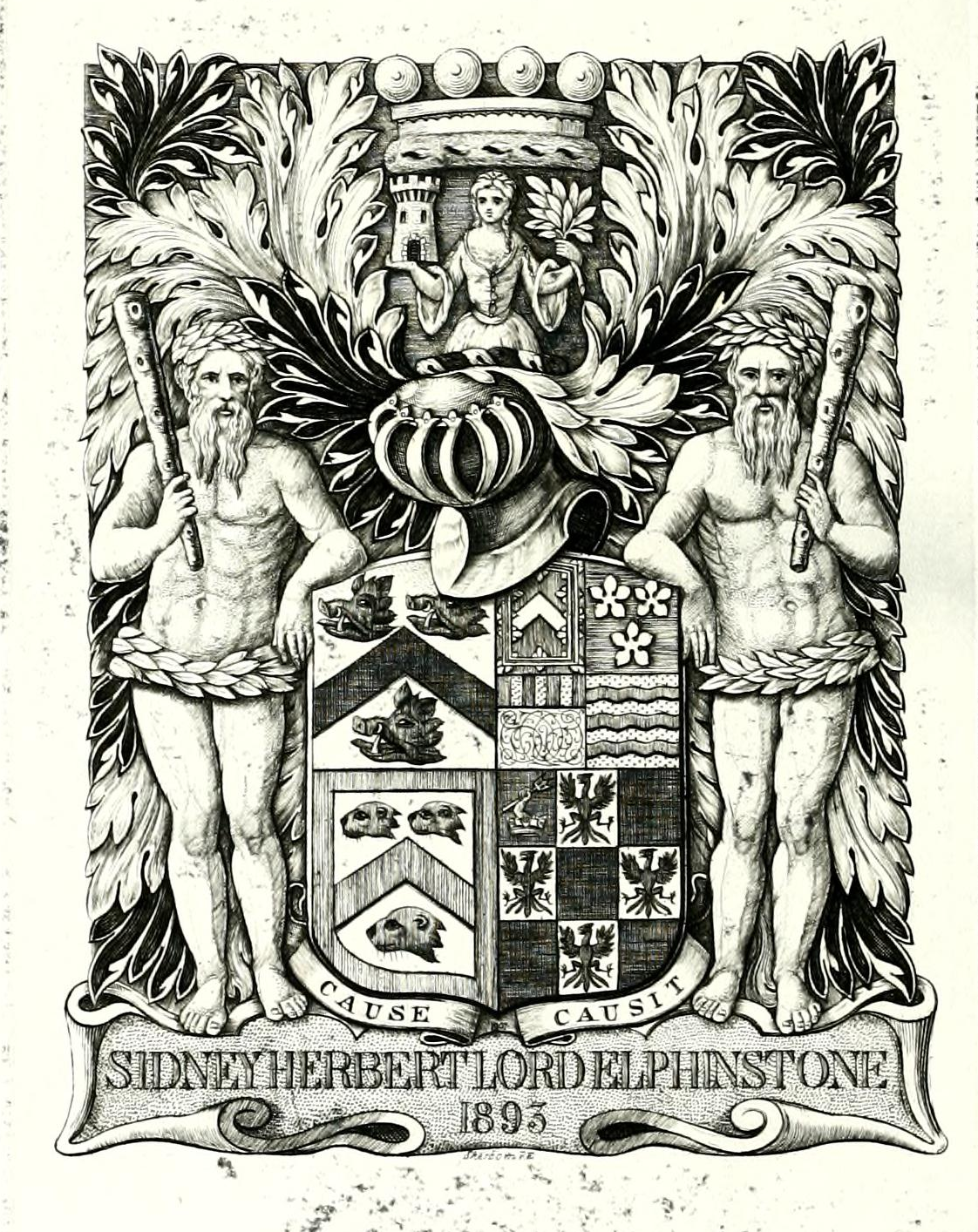
Lord Elphinstone's bookplate, engraved by Charles William Sherborn

Sidney Herbert Elphinstone was born at Carberry Tower south-east of Edinburgh on 27 July 1869. He was the son of William, 15th Lord Elphinstone and Lady Constance Murray (28 Dec 1838 – 16 Mar 1922).

His maternal grandparents were Alexander Murray, 6th Earl of Dunmore and Lady Catherine Herbert, daughter of the 11th Earl of Pembroke. His paternal grandparents were Lieutenant-Colonel James Drummond Fullerton Elphinstone and his second wife, Anna Maria (née Buller) Elphinstone, the daughter of Sir Edward Buller, 1st Baronet.

He was educated at Marlborough College and succeeded his father in 1893.

== Career ==
Lord Elphinstone was Lord High Commissioner to the General Assembly of the Church of Scotland in 1923 and 1924, Lord Clerk Register of Scotland and Keeper of the Signet from 1944 until his death. From 1924 to 1930 he served as president of the influential conservationist group the Cockburn Association. He was invested as a Knight of the Thistle in 1927 and was Chancellor of the Order from 1949. He was Captain General of the Royal Company of Archers from 1935 until 1953 and was Governor of the Bank of Scotland from 1924 to 1955.

In 1938, he was elected a Fellow of the Royal Society of Edinburgh (FRSE). His proposers were Hugh Macmillan, Baron Macmillan, Sir Thomas Henry Holland, James Pickering Kendall and James Watt.

=== Scrap book ===
Lord Elphinstone's Scrap book, which is held in the Mary Ann Beinecke Decorative Art Collection at the Sterling and Francine Clark Art Institute Library, provides a list of the clans of Scotland with the badges of distinction used by them. This rare book includes textile samples of clan tartans along with watercolour illustrations of clan flowers. Elphinstone was at one time a Trustee and Commissioner of Manufacturers in Scotland. The Scrap book can be viewed in the Digital Collections of the Clark Library.

== Marriage and later life ==
Lord Elphinstone married Lady Mary Bowes-Lyon on 24 July 1910 in Westminster. She was the daughter of Claude Bowes-Lyon, 14th Earl of Strathmore and Kinghorne and Cecilia Cavendish-Bentinck. She was also a sister of Queen Elizabeth The Queen Mother. The couple had five children:

- The Hon. Mary Elizabeth Elphinstone (1911–1980). She was a bridesmaid at the wedding of Prince Albert, Duke of York, and Lady Elizabeth Bowes-Lyon on 26 April 1923.
- John Elphinstone, 17th Lord Elphinstone (1914–1975). He died unmarried and had no issue.
- The Hon. Jean Constance Elphinstone (1915–1999), married Captain John Wills. Their daughter Marilyn was a goddaughter of Princess Margaret and a bridesmaid at her 1960 wedding.
- The Hon. and Rev. Andrew Charles Victor Elphinstone (1918–1975), married Jean Hambro and had issue. His wife was a Lady-in-Waiting to Queen Elizabeth II. Their son James became the 18th Lord Elphinstone.
- The Hon. Margaret Elphinstone (1925–2016), married Denys Rhodes and had issue. She was a bridesmaid at the 1947 wedding of the then-Princess Elizabeth and the Duke of Edinburgh.

The Lord Elphinstone died on 28 November 1955, aged 86.

Political offices
Preceded by The Earl of Mar	Lord Clerk Register; 1944–1955	Succeeded by The Duke of Buccleuch
Honorary titles
Preceded by The Earl of Mar	Chancellor of the Order of the Thistle; 1949–1955	Succeeded by The Earl of Airlie
Peerage of Scotland
Preceded by William Elphinstone	Lord Elphinstone; 1893–1955	Succeeded by John Elphinstone
Peerage of the United Kingdom
Preceded by William Elphinstone	Baron Elphinstone; 1893–1955	Succeeded by John Elphinstone
