= Andrew Elphinstone =

British cleric and soldier (1918–1975)

The Reverend and Honourable Andrew Elphinstone TD
- Study for a portrait by Philip de László, 1925
- Born: Andrew Charles Victor Elphinstone; 10 November 1918; 6 Upper Brook Street, London, England
- Died: 19 March 1975 (aged 56); Worplesdon, Surrey, England
- Education: Eton College; New College, Oxford; Wycliffe Hall, Oxford
- Spouse: Jean Gibbs (m. 1946)
- Children: Rosemary Pigé-Leschallas; James Elphinstone, 18th Lord Elphinstone
- Parents: Sidney Elphinstone, 16th Lord Elphinstone (father); Lady Mary Bowes-Lyon (mother)

Andrew Charles Victor Elphinstone (10 November 1918 – 19 March 1975) was a British cleric and soldier. He was a maternal first cousin of Elizabeth II.

== Early life ==
Elphinstone was born on 10 November 1918 at No. 6 Upper Brook Street in Mayfair, Central London. He was the fourth child and second son of Sidney, 16th Lord Elphinstone, and Lady Mary Bowes-Lyon. He was baptised on 19 December at St Mark's, North Audley Street. His godparents included Princess Christian and his maternal uncle, the Hon. Michael Bowes-Lyon.

Elphinstone was raised between London and Carberry Tower, his family's ancestral seat in East Lothian, Scotland. In 1923, his maternal aunt, Lady Elizabeth Bowes-Lyon, married Prince Albert, Duke of York (later George VI), making Elphinstone a nephew by marriage of the future king. Two years later, he sat for a portait by Philip de László.

He was educated at St Peter's Court, Eton College and New College, Oxford.

== Career ==
=== Military career ===
In 1938, Elphinstone was commissioned as a second lieutenant in the 4th Battalion, Queen's Own Cameron Highlanders. He was serving with the Camerons at the start of World War II and later served with the Intelligence Corps. From 1941 to 1943, he was aide-de-camp to the Viceroy of India, Lord Linlithgow.

Elphinstone relinquished his commission in 1953, retaining the honorary rank of captain. In 1964, he was awarded the Territorial Efficiency Decoration.

=== Ecclesiastical career ===
St Mary's, Worplesdon, where Elphinstone was rector.

From 1948 to 1950, Elphinstone trained for the priesthood at Wycliffe Hall, Oxford. He was ordained to the diaconate by the Bishop of Salisbury, William Anderson, at Salisbury Cathedral on 21 December 1950. He served his curacy at Wimborne Minster, Dorset, and was ordained to the priesthood by Anderson at Salisbury on 21 December 1951.

Elphinstone was rector of Worplesdon, Surrey, from 1953 to 1962. He announced his resignation in late 1961, stating he felt called to work beyond parish ministry. His one theological work, Freedom, Suffering and Love, was published posthumously in 1976.

== Personal life ==
On 29 May 1946, Elphinstone married Jean Gibbs (née Hambro), widow of the Hon. Vicary Gibbs and a lady-in-waiting to his cousin, Princess Elizabeth, at St Margaret's, Westminster. Princess Elizabeth served as a bridesmaid at the wedding. The couple had two children: Rosemary Elizabeth (born 13 August 1947) and James Alexander (22 April 1953 – 19 December 1994).

In 1950, Elphinstone became a godfather to Princess Anne. In 1973, he assisted the Archbishop of Canterbury, Michael Ramsey, in officiating at her wedding to Mark Phillips.

From 1955, Elphinstone was heir presumptive to his elder brother, John, 17th Lord Elphinstone. John outlived him by eight months, after which the title passed to Elphinstone's son.

Elphinstone died at home in Worplesdon on 19 March 1975, aged 56. Queen Elizabeth II, Queen Elizabeth the Queen Mother, Princess Margaret and Princess Anne attended his memorial service held at Worplesdon Parish Church on 27 March.

== Bibliography ==
- Freedom, Suffering and Love. London: SCM Press, 1976. ISBN 9780334005025.
