= George Chetwode =

Royal Navy Admiral (1877–1957)

Admiral Sir George Chetwode KCB CBE
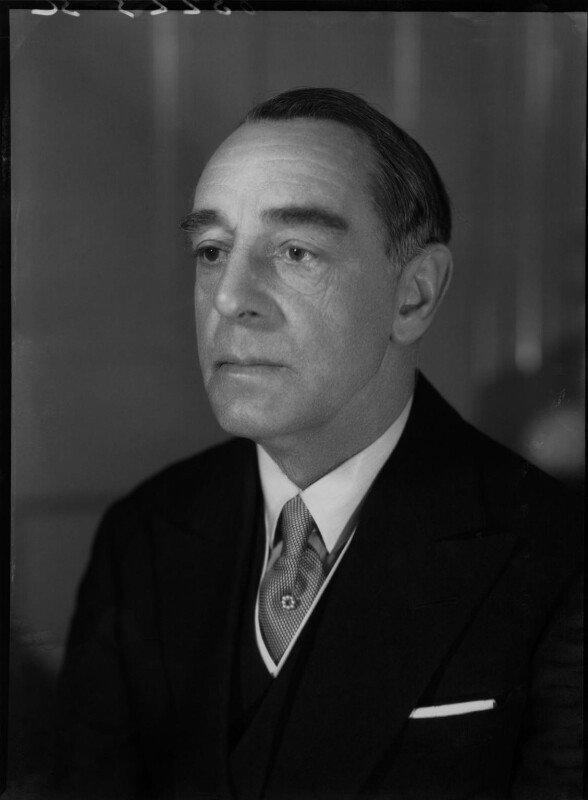
- Chetwode in 1938
- Born: 10 December 1877
- Died: 11 March 1957 (aged 79)
- Military career
- Allegiance: United Kingdom
- Branch: Royal Navy
- Rank: Admiral
- Commands: HMS Queen Elizabeth; HMS Warspite
- Conflicts: Boxer Rebellion; World War I
- Awards: Knight Commander of the Order of the Bath; Commander of the Order of the British Empire

Admiral Sir George Knightley Chetwode, KCB, CBE (10 December 1877 – 11 March 1957) was a Royal Navy officer who became Naval Secretary.

== Naval career ==
Born the son of Sir George Chetwode, 6th Baronet, Chetwode joined the Royal Navy and was appointed a Lieutenant in December 1899. He was appointed temporary to the gunboat HMS Esk, in lieu of a sub-lieutenant, on 31 December 1899. The following year he served on the China Station during the Boxer Rebellion in 1900.

He served in World War I taking part in the Battle of Jutland in 1916 and commanding destroyers for the rest of the War. He was appointed Deputy Director of Naval Intelligence in 1923 and then given command of the battleship HMS Queen Elizabeth followed by the battleship HMS Warspite. He was made Naval Secretary in 1929 and Commander of the 1st Cruiser Squadron in the Mediterranean Fleet in 1932. His last appointment was as Admiral commanding the reserves in 1933 before he retired in 1936.

== Family ==
In 1908 he married Alice Clara Vaughan-Lee; they had two sons, including the British Army officer and cricketer George Chetwode. In 1939 he married Elizabeth Jane Taylor.

Military offices
Preceded by Eric Fullerton	Naval Secretary; 1929–1932	Succeeded by Sidney Meyrick
