= George Chetwode (cricketer) =

English cricketer and soldier

George David Chetwode
- Born: 24 August 1914; Mayfair, London, England
- Died: 4 October 1999 (aged 85); Upper Slaughter, Gloucestershire, England
- Spouse: Lady Willa Elliot-Murray-Kynynmound
- Children: 6
- Father: George Chetwode
- Cricket career

Cricket information
- Batting: Left-handed
- Bowling: Right-arm medium

Domestic team information
- Years: Team
- 1938/39: Europeans

Career statistics
Competition	First-class
Matches	1
Runs scored	7
Batting average	3.50
100s/50s	0/0
Top score	6
Catches/stumpings	0/–
- Source: Cricinfo, 20 December 2023
- Military career
- Allegiance: United Kingdom
- Branch: British Army
- Service years: 1934–1948
- Rank: Major
- Unit: Coldstream Guards
- Conflicts: World War II

George David Chetwode MBE (24 August 1914 – 4 October 1999) was an English first-class cricketer and an officer in the British Army.

The son of Admiral Sir George Chetwode, he was born at Mayfair in August 1914. He attended the Royal Military College at Sandhurst, graduating from there into the Coldstream Guards as a second lieutenant in August 1934, with promotion to lieutenant following in August 1937. He was seconded to British India in September 1937 to be aide-de-camp to the Governor of the Bombay Presidency, the Earl of Scarbrough. While in India, Chetwode made a single appearance in first-class cricket for the Europeans cricket team against the Parsees at Bombay in the 1938–39 Bombay Pentangular Tournament. Batting twice in the match, he was dismissed by Dadabhoy Havewala for 6 runs in the Europeans first innings, while in their second innings he was dismissed leg before wicket for a single run by S. M. Palsetia.

Chetwode served in the Second World War, during which he was promoted to captain in August 1942, and later in the war he was made an MBE in December 1944. After the war had ended, he was promoted to major in August 1947, prior to retiring with a gratuity in May 1948. In retirement, he lived at Swiss Farm House in Upper Slaughter, Gloucestershire. It was there that he died in October 1999. Chetwode was married to Lady Willa Elliot-Murray-Kynynmound (1924–2010), the daughter of Victor Elliot-Murray-Kynynmound, 5th Earl of Minto. The couple had six children. Through their daughter Willa, his grandson is Alexander Elphinstone, 19th Lord Elphinstone.
