= Jean Woodroffe =

British courtier (1923–2017)

Jean Woodroffe CVO
- Born: Jean Frances Hambro; 22 February 1923; Paddington, London, England
- Died: 7 December 2017 (aged 94); Warminster, Wiltshire, England
- Spouses: Vicary Gibbs (m. 1942; died 1944) Andrew Elphinstone (m. 1946; died 1975) John Woodroffe (m. 1980; died 1990)
- Children: 4; including James
- Father: Angus Hambro

Jean Frances Woodroffe (née Hambro; 22 February 1923 – 7 December 2017), styled during her first two marriages as The Hon. Mrs Gibbs and The Hon. Mrs Elphinstone, was a British courtier who was lady-in-waiting to Queen Elizabeth II.

== Early life and family ==
Born on 22 February 1923 in Paddington, she was the daughter of Captain Angus Valdemar Hambro and his second wife Vanda Dorothy Julia Charlton (1885–1981). Her paternal great-grandfather, Baron Carl Joachim Hambro, emigrated from Denmark in 1832 and founded Hambros Bank in 1839.

== Royal service ==
In May 1945, at the suggestion of Sir Arthur Penn, Woodroffe was appointed lady-in-waiting to Princess Elizabeth. She chaperoned the Princess at dances, accompanied her on visits to Northern Ireland and Canada and attended to her during state visits. She occasionally accompanied Princess Margaret on solo engagements. She accompanied the two young princesses as the ventured beyond the palace gates on VE Day.

After Elizabeth II's accession to the throne in 1952, Woodroffe became a Woman of the Bedchamber. She eventually lessened her duties and was appointed Extra Woman of the Bedchamber in March 1953. In this role, she participated in the coronation procession. She was appointed a Commander of the Royal Victorian Order (CVO) in the 1953 Coronation Honours. She undertook occasional duties throughout the 1950s and 1960s and was listed an extra lady-in-waiting for the remainder of her life.

Woodroffe was a keen golfer. She golfed for the Ladies’ Parliamentary team and was lady captain of Worplesdon Golf Club.

== Marriages and children ==
Woodroffe was married three times. Her first marriage on 19 September 1942 at the Guards' Chapel, Wellington Barracks, was to Captain The Hon. Paul Vicary Gibbs (11 February 1921 – 20 September 1944), son and heir of Walter Gibbs, 4th Baron Aldenham. They had two daughters: Susan Frances (14 May 1943 – 1 July 1943), who died in infancy, and Jennifer Susan (born 12 May 1944). Gibbs was killed in the Battle of Nijmegen.

She then married The Rev. and Hon. Andrew Charles Victor Elphinstone (11 November 1918 – 19 March 1975), second son of Sidney Elphinstone, 16th Lord Elphinstone, and Lady Mary Bowes-Lyon on 29 May 1946 at St Margaret's, Westminster. Princess Elizabeth was her bridesmaid. They had two children: Rosemary Elizabeth (born 13 August 1947) and James Alexander (22 April 1953 – 19 December 1994).

Her third marriage was on 14 April 1980 at Guildford Cathedral to Lieutenant Colonel John William Richard Woodroffe (8 April 1916 – 13 December 1990), widower of her elder sister Patricia who had died in 1978. She was widowed on 13 December 1990. Woodroffe died on 7 December 2017, at the age of 94. A memorial service was held on 10 January 2018 at St Mary's Church, Worplesdon, Surrey.
