= Wedding of Prince Albert and Lady Elizabeth Bowes-Lyon =

1923 British royal wedding

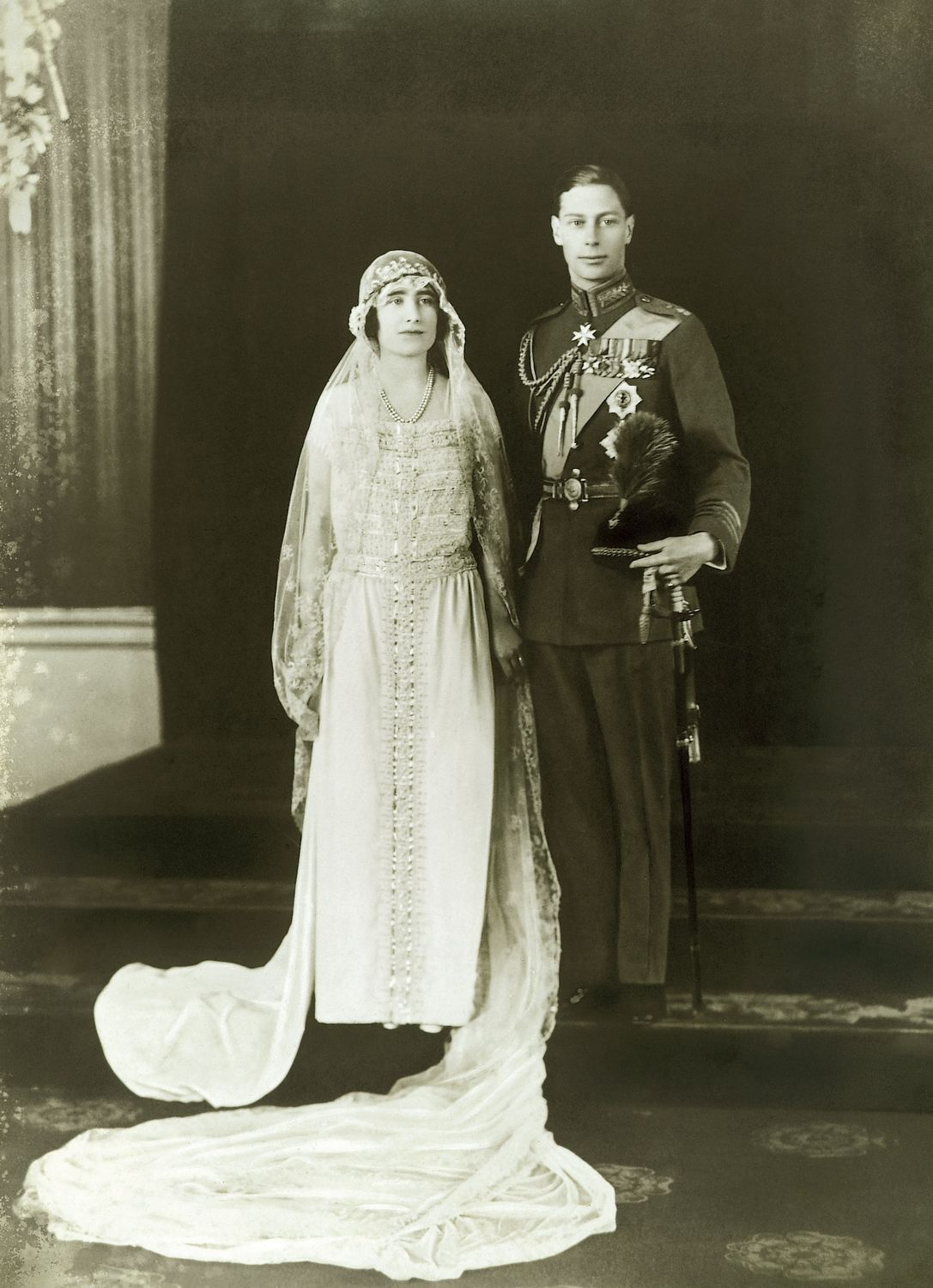
- The Duke and Duchess of York on their wedding day
- Date: 26 April 1923; 103 years ago
- Venue: Westminster Abbey
- Location: London, England
- Participants: Prince Albert, Duke of York (later King George VI); Lady Elizabeth Bowes-Lyon (later Queen Elizabeth the Queen Mother)

The wedding of Prince Albert, Duke of York (later King George VI), and Lady Elizabeth Bowes-Lyon (later Queen Elizabeth the Queen Mother (Note: From 1952 to 2002 to avoid confusion with her daughter Queen Elizabeth II.)) took place on 26 April 1923 at Westminster Abbey. The bride was a member of the Bowes-Lyon family, while the groom was the second son of King George V.

== Courtship and proposals ==
Prince Albert, Duke of York, "Bertie" to the family, was the second son of King George V. He was second in line to succeed his father, after his elder brother Edward, Prince of Wales. He initially proposed to Lady Elizabeth Bowes-Lyon in 1921 (reportedly by proxy), but she turned him down, being "afraid never, never again to be free to think, speak and act as I feel I really ought to". When he declared he would marry no one else, his mother, Queen Mary, visited Glamis, Elizabeth's home, to see for herself the young woman her son wanted to marry. She became convinced that Elizabeth was "the one girl who could make Bertie happy", but nevertheless refused to interfere. At the same time, Elizabeth was courted by James Stuart, Albert's equerry, until he left the Prince's service for a better-paid job in the American oil business.

In February 1922, Elizabeth was a bridesmaid at the wedding of Albert's sister, Princess Mary, to Viscount Lascelles. The following month, Albert proposed again, but she refused him once more. Eventually, on 13 January 1923, Elizabeth agreed to marry Albert, despite her misgivings about royal life. Following the engagement, she gave an interview to the press. She appeared to be relaxed and laughing and referred to Albert by his nickname "Bertie", which made the King furious in private.

== Wedding ==
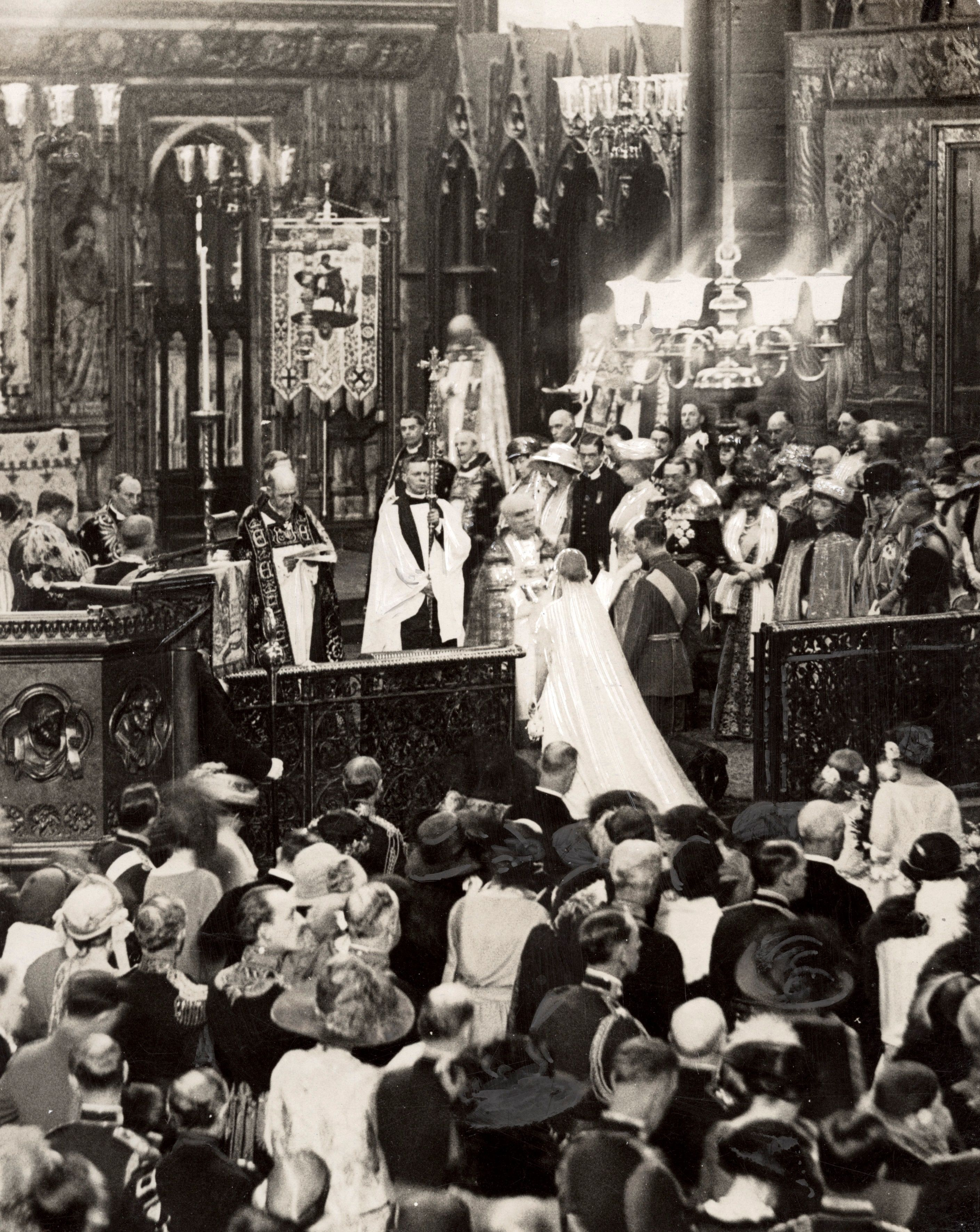
The Archbishop of York addresses the couple during the wedding ceremony

Prince Albert, Duke of York, and Lady Elizabeth Bowes-Lyon were married on 26 April 1923 in Westminster Abbey. The couple's wedding rings were crafted from 22-carat Welsh gold from the Clogau St David's mine in Bontddu. During the years to come, the use of Clogau Gold for the wedding rings of the royal family became a tradition. In an unexpected and unprecedented gesture, Elizabeth laid her bouquet at the Tomb of the Unknown Warrior on her way into the Abbey, in memory of her brother Fergus. Ever since, the bouquets of subsequent royal brides have traditionally been laid at the tomb, though after the wedding ceremony rather than before.

Lady Elizabeth was attended by eight bridesmaids:

- Lady Mary Cambridge (26), daughter of the Marquess and Marchioness of Cambridge, niece of Queen Mary and therefore a cousin of the groom;
- Lady May Cambridge (17), daughter of Princess Alice and Earl of Athlone, niece of Queen Mary and therefore first cousin of the groom;
- Lady Mary Thynn (20), daughter of the Marquess and Marchioness of Bath;
- Lady Katharine Hamilton (23), daughter of the Duke and Duchess of Abercorn;
- The Hon. Diamond Hardinge (22), daughter of Lord and Lady Hardinge;
- The Hon. Cecilia Bowes-Lyon (11), daughter of Lord and Lady Glamis, niece of the bride;
- The Hon. Mary Elizabeth Elphinstone (11), daughter of Lord and Lady Elphinstone, niece of the bride;
- Miss Betty Cator (later sister-in-law to the bride, as the Hon. Mrs Michael Bowes-Lyon).

The newly formed British Broadcasting Company had wanted to record and broadcast the event on radio, but the Chapter vetoed the idea (although the Dean, Herbert Edward Ryle, was in favour). Albert's freedom in choosing Elizabeth, not a member of a royal family, though the daughter of a peer, was considered a gesture in favour of political modernisation; previously, princes were expected to marry princesses.

The event was not broadcast on the radio due to the Archbishop of Canterbury's concern "that men might listen to it in public houses".

The official wedding cake was baked by London bakery McVitie & Price. It was made of four tiers, stood three metres high, and weighed about 350 kg.

== Wedding attire ==
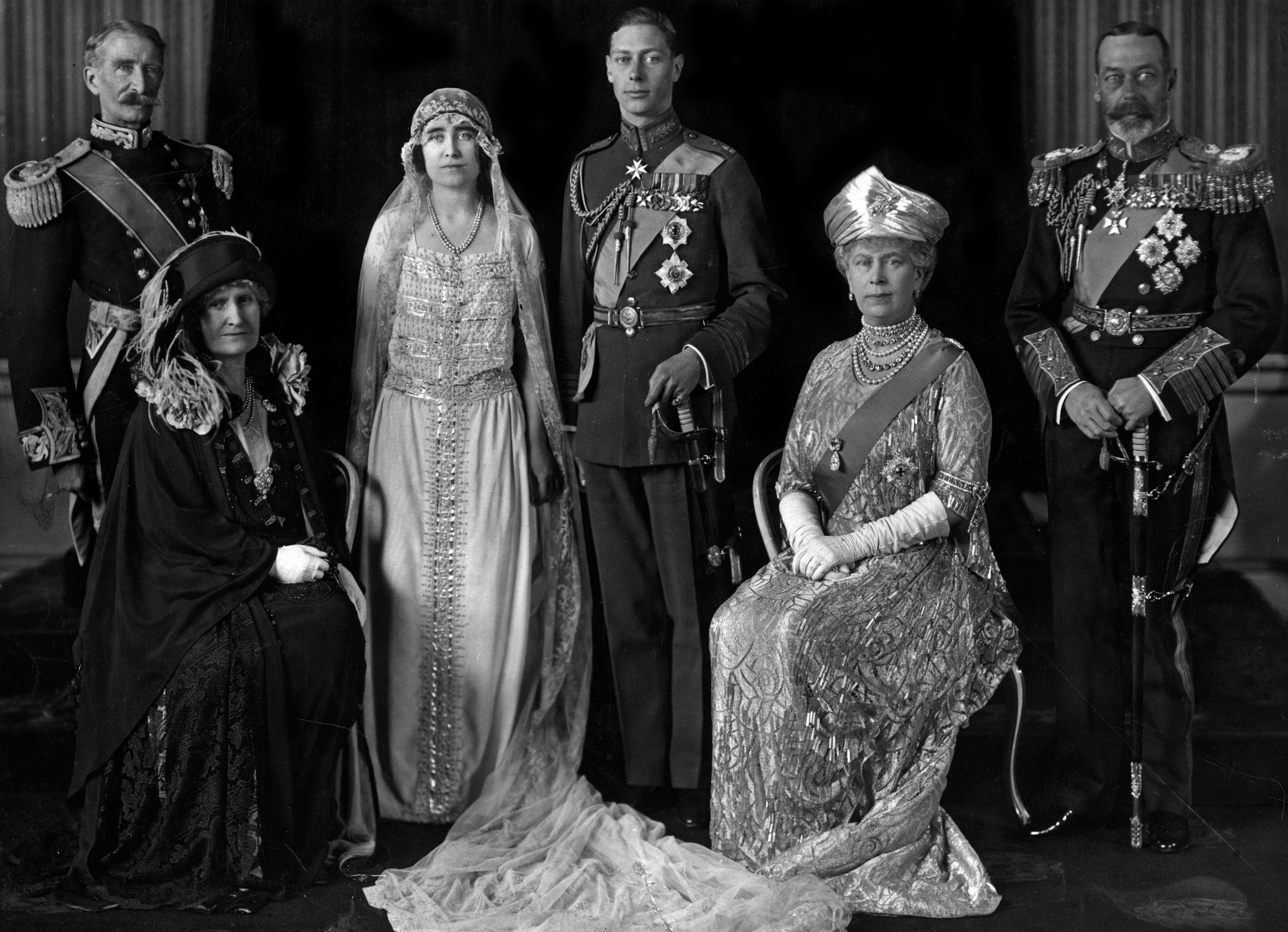
Bride and groom with their parents

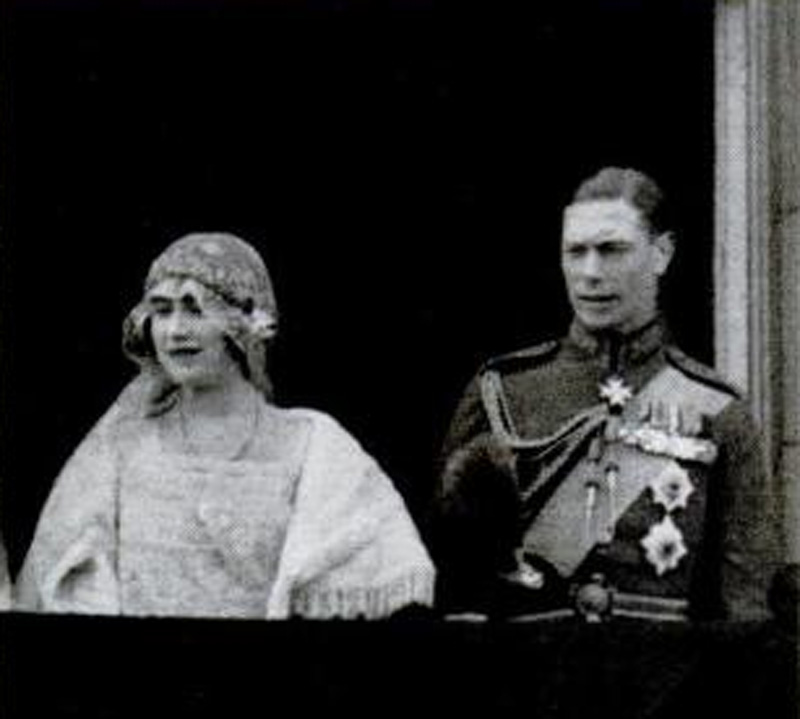
The couple on the balcony of Buckingham Palace

=== Bride's dress ===
Elizabeth's wedding dress was made from deep ivory chiffon moire, embroidered with pearls and silver thread. It was intended to match the traditional Flanders lace provided for the train by Queen Mary. Elizabeth's dress, in the fashion of the early 1920s, was designed by Madame Handley-Seymour, dressmaker to Queen Mary. Its design was reportedly based on a dress created by Jeanne Lanvin and was "suggestive of a medieval Italian gown". Elizabeth chose not to wear a tiara, and instead a chaplet of leaves secured the veil that was borrowed from the Queen.

A strip of Brussels lace, inserted in the dress, was a Strathmore family heirloom. A female ancestor of the bride wore it to a grand ball for "Bonnie Prince Charlie", Charles Edward Stuart.

The silver leaf girdle was embellished with spring-green tulle, trailing to the ground; silver and rose thistles fastened it. According to a contemporary news article: "In the trimming the bride has defied all old superstitions about the unluckiness of green." Elizabeth wore "an orange blossom wreath", which featured "white roses of York". The dress had two trains: "one fastened at the hips, the other floating from the shoulders". Elizabeth wore an ermine cape, given to her by the King, over her dress en route to the Abbey and on the balcony of Buckingham Palace.

Unlike more recent dresses, details of this one were publicly revealed in advance of the wedding day. Contemporary articles noted that official description of the dress would be released on the wedding day. The dress was worked on until the last possible opportunity: the day before the wedding, Elizabeth divided her time between the wedding rehearsal and her dressmakers.

A prototype of the wedding dress was sold at an auction in 2011 for £3,500. It was one of the three initial designs prepared for the wedding and the one used for the final design.

=== Groom's uniform ===
Prince Albert wore RAF full dress in the rank of group captain, his senior service rank at the time of his marriage.

== Honeymoon ==
Upon their marriage, Elizabeth Bowes-Lyon was styled Her Royal Highness the Duchess of York. Following a wedding breakfast at Buckingham Palace prepared by chef Gabriel Tschumi, they honeymooned at Polesden Lacey, a manor house in Surrey, and then went to Scotland, where she caught "unromantic" whooping cough.

== Gallery ==
Combined coat of arms of Albert and Elizabeth, the Duke and Duchess of York

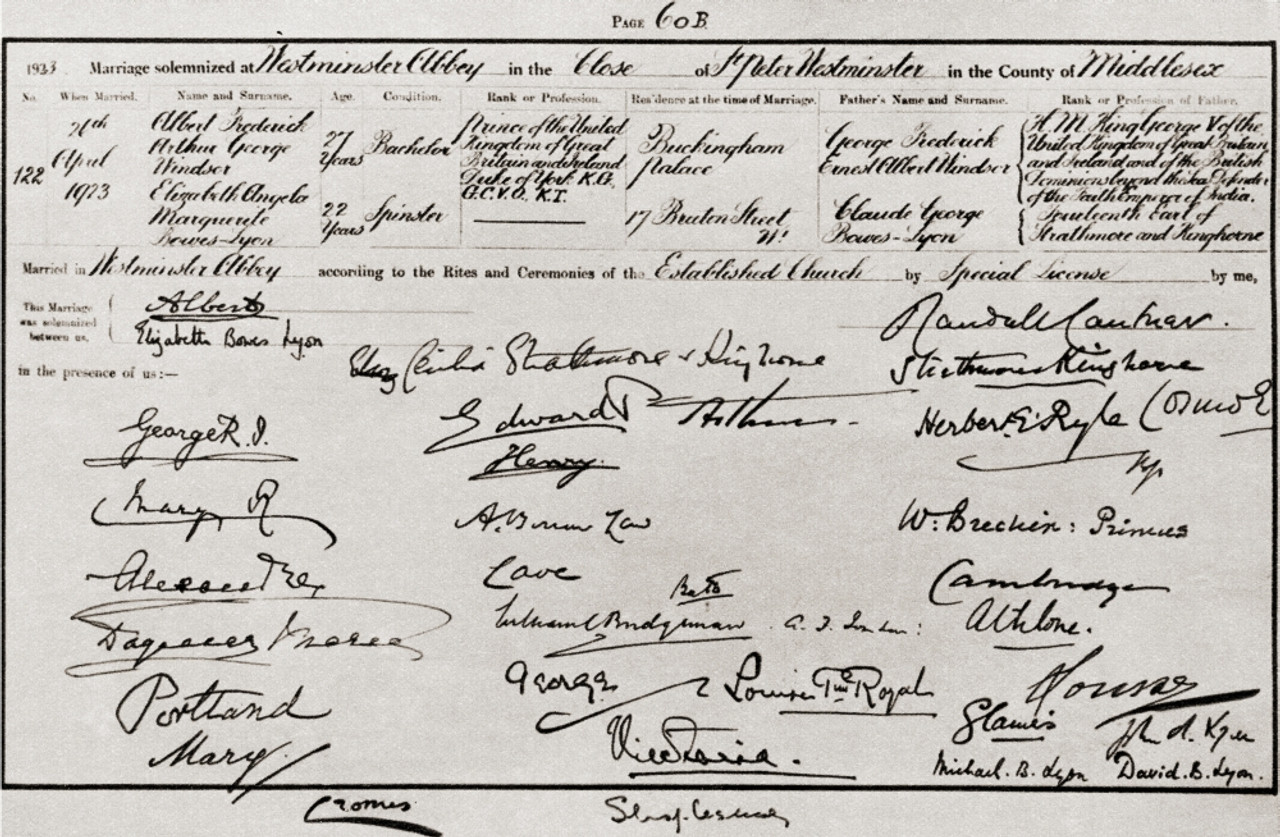
Marriage certificate

== Sources ==
- Shawcross, William (2009), Queen Elizabeth The Queen Mother: The Official Biography, Macmillan, ISBN 978-1-4050-4859-0
- Roberts, Andrew (2000), Antonia Fraser (ed.), The House of Windsor, London: Cassell & Co., ISBN 0-304-35406-6
