= John Elphinstone, 17th Lord Elphinstone =

British aristocrat & army officer (1914-1975)

The Right Honourable The Lord Elphinstone DL
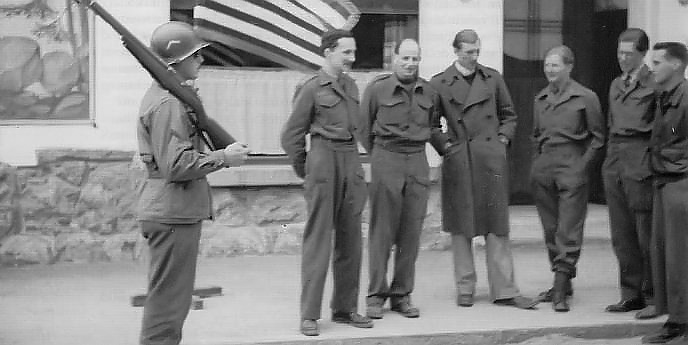
- Lord Elphinstone, second from left

Personal details
- Born: John Alexander Elphinstone, Master of Elphinstone; 22 March 1914
- Died: 15 November 1975 (aged 61)
- Parents: Sidney Elphinstone, 16th Lord Elphinstone; Lady Mary Bowes-Lyon
- Relatives: Queen Elizabeth The Queen Mother (maternal aunt); Elizabeth II (first cousin); Princess Margaret, Countess of Snowdon (first cousin)

Military service
- Allegiance: United Kingdom
- Branch/service: British Army
- Rank: Lieutenant
- Unit: Black Watch; Royal Company of Archers
- Battles/wars: World War II

John Alexander Elphinstone, 17th Lord Elphinstone and 3rd Baron Elphinstone (22 March 1914 – 15 November 1975) was a British nobleman and serviceman during World War II. He was a first cousin of Queen Elizabeth II.

== Early life ==
Elphinstone was born on 22 March 1914. He was a son of Sidney Elphinstone, 16th Lord Elphinstone, and Lady Mary Bowes-Lyon. Among his siblings was the Rev. Hon. Andrew Charles Victor Elphinstone (the aide-de-camp to the Viceroy of India from 1941 to 1943) and the Hon. Margaret Elphinstone, wife of writer Denys Rhodes. His father was an avid hunter who in 1903 shot the "largest moose ever killed in Alaska."

His paternal grandparents were William Elphinstone, 15th Lord Elphinstone (the 1st Baron Elphinstone) and the former Lady Constance Euphemia Woronzow Murray (second daughter of Alexander Murray, 6th Earl of Dunmore). His maternal grandparents were Claude Bowes-Lyon, 14th Earl of Strathmore and Kinghorne and the former Nina Cecilia Cavendish-Bentinck (eldest surviving daughter and co-heiress of Rev. Charles Cavendish-Bentinck, a grandson of the 3rd Duke of Portland). He was a nephew of Queen Elizabeth The Queen Mother and a first cousin of Queen Elizabeth II and Princess Margaret, Countess of Snowdon.

== Career ==
During World War II, he became a captain in the Scottish Black Watch and was later made a lieutenant with the Royal Company of Archers. While in service, he became a prisoner of war, and was one of the "prominente" held in Oflag IV-C (Colditz Castle); as a nephew of King George VI he was considered a potential bargaining chip by the Nazis.

Lord Elphinstone served as president of the Scottish Association of Boys' Clubs, chairman of council of the Scottish branch of British Red Cross Society, and president of the Royal Zoological Society of Scotland. He also served as a director of the Bank of Scotland and the Scottish Provident Institute.

== Personal life ==
In 1970, during Manitoba's centennial, he was invited by the community of Elphinstone and gave a silver map case, which is today located at the Elphinstone post office, all named in his family's honor.

As he died unmarried and without issue, he was succeeded in his titles by his nephew James.

== Ancestry ==
Ancestors of John Elphinstone, 17th Lord Elphinstone

16. William Elphinstone
8. James Fuller-Elphinstone
17. Elizabeth Fullerton
4. William, 15th Lord Elphinstone
18. Sir Edward Buller, 1st Baronet
9. Anna Maria Buller
19. Gertrude van Cortlandt
2. Sidney, 16th Lord Elphinstone
20. George Murray, 5th Earl of Dunmore
10. Alexander Murray, 6th Earl of Dunmore
21. Lady Susan Douglas-Hamilton
5. Constance Murray
22. George Herbert, 11th Earl of Pembroke
11. Lady Catherine Herbert
23. Catherine Vorontsov
1. John Elphinstone, 17th Lord Elphinstone
24. Thomas Lyon-Bowes, Lord Glamis
12. Claude Bowes-Lyon, 13th Earl of Strathmore and Kinghorne
25. Charlotte Grimstead
6. Claude Bowes-Lyon, 14th Earl of Strathmore and Kinghorne
26. Oswald Smith
13. Frances Dora Smith
27. Henrietta Hodgson
3. Mary Bowes-Lyon
28. Lord Charles Bentinck
14. William Cavendish-Bentinck
29. Anne Wellesley
7. Cecilia Cavendish-Bentinck
30. Edwyn Burnaby
15. Caroline Louisa Burnaby
31. Anne Salisbury

Peerage of Scotland
Preceded by Sidney Herbert Elphinstone	Lord Elphinstone; 1955–1975	Succeeded by James Alexander Elphinstone
Peerage of the United Kingdom
Preceded by Sidney Herbert Elphinstone	Baron Elphinstone; 1955–1975	Succeeded by James Alexander Elphinstone
