= Mary Elphinstone, Lady Elphinstone =

British aristocrat (1883–1961)

The Right Honourable The Lady Elphinstone GCVO
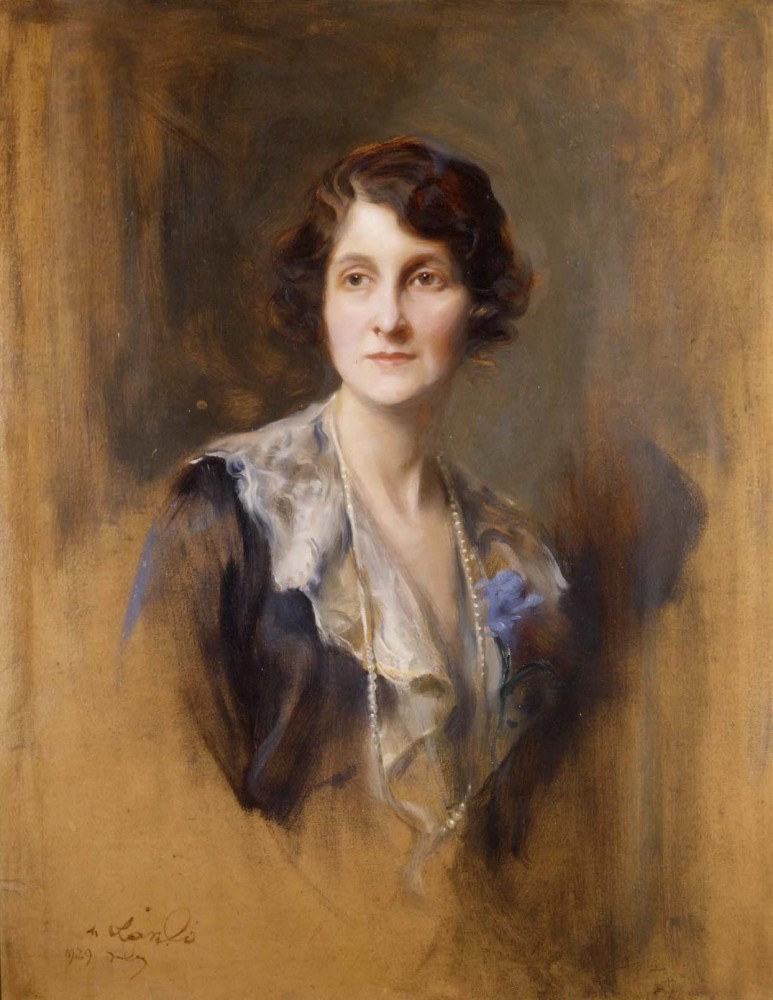
- Portrait by Philip de László, 1929

Personal details
- Born: Hon. Mary Frances Bowes-Lyon; 30 August 1883 Angus, Scotland
- Died: 8 February 1961 (aged 77) Inveresk, Scotland
- Spouse: Sidney Elphinstone, 16th Lord Elphinstone (m. 1910; died 1955)
- Children: Hon. Mary Elphinstone; John Elphinstone, 17th Lord Elphinstone; Hon. Jean Elphinstone; Hon. Andrew Elphinstone; Hon. Margaret Rhodes
- Parents: Claude Bowes-Lyon, 14th Earl of Strathmore and Kinghorne (father); Cecilia Cavendish-Bentinck (mother)

Mary Frances Elphinstone, Lady Elphinstone GCVO (née Bowes-Lyon; 30 August 1883 – 8 February 1961), was a British aristocrat. She was an elder sister of Queen Elizabeth the Queen Mother and an aunt and godmother of Queen Elizabeth II.

== Early life ==
Lady Elphinstone was born The Honourable Mary Frances Bowes-Lyon on 30 August 1883 in Angus, Scotland, to Claude Bowes-Lyon, 14th Earl of Strathmore and Kinghorne and Cecilia Cavendish-Bentinck. She was an elder sister of Elizabeth Bowes-Lyon known as Queen Elizabeth of the United Kingdom (later the Queen Mother).

== Personal life ==
Lady Mary married Sidney Elphinstone, 16th Lord Elphinstone (1869–1955) on 24 July 1910 in Westminster. Lord Elphinstone inherited extensive estates, some of which had been in the family since the reign of King David II of Scotland. He served as a governor of the Bank of Scotland, Lord Clerk Register of Scotland and Keeper of the Signet and Lord High Commissioner of the Church of Scotland. The couple had five children:

- The Hon. Mary Elizabeth Elphinstone (2 July 1911 – 16 May 1980), who was a bridesmaid at the wedding of Prince Albert, Duke of York, and Lady Elizabeth Bowes-Lyon in 1923.
- John Elphinstone, 17th Lord Elphinstone (22 March 1914 – 15 November 1975)
- The Hon. Jean Constance Elphinstone (3 April 1915 – 29 November 1999), who married Captain John Lycett Wills (29 May 1910 – 1 October 1999). Their daughter Marilyn was a god-daughter of Princess Margaret and a bridesmaid at her 1960 wedding.
- The Rev. The Hon. Andrew Charles Victor Elphinstone (10 November 1918 – 19 March 1975), who married Jean Frances Hambro (22 February 1923 – 7 December 2017) and had issue. His wife was a Lady-in-Waiting to Queen Elizabeth II.
- The Hon. Margaret Elphinstone (9 June 1925 – 25 November 2016), who married Denys Rhodes (9 July 1919 – 30 October 1981) and had issue. She was a bridesmaid at the 1947 wedding of the then Princess Elizabeth and Prince Philip.

In 1937, Lady Elphinstone attended her sister and brother-in-law's coronation whereby she sat behind her niece Princess Elizabeth, who would be the future queen, in the royal box. She was one of the leading guests in the wedding of Princess Elizabeth and Philip Mountbatten in 1947.

Lord Elphinstone died at their home Carberry Tower, Musselburgh, on 28 November 1955. Lady Elphinstone, who served as president of the Midlothian branch of the British Red Cross, died on 8 February 1961, aged 77, also at Carberry Tower in Inveresk, Scotland.
