= Old Etonians =

List of former pupils of Eton College, UK

This is a list of notable former pupils of Eton College, a 13–18 public (fee-charging), boarding, secondary school for boys in Eton, Berkshire, England. Former pupils of the school are known as Old Etonians.

== Politics ==
Eton has produced twenty British prime ministers:

- Robert Walpole, 1st Earl of Orford, first Prime Minister of Great Britain
- John Stuart, 3rd Earl of Bute
- George Grenville
- William Pitt the Elder, 1st Earl of Chatham
- Frederick North, Lord North, former Prime Minister of Great Britain
- William Grenville, 1st Baron Grenville, former Prime Minister of the United Kingdom
- George Canning
- Arthur Wellesley, 1st Duke of Wellington
- Charles Grey, 2nd Earl Grey
- William Lamb, Viscount Melbourne
- Edward Smith-Stanley, 14th Earl of Derby
- William Ewart Gladstone
- Robert Gascoyne-Cecil, 3rd Marquess of Salisbury
- Archibald Primrose, 5th Earl of Rosebery
- Arthur James Balfour, 1st Earl of Balfour
- Anthony Eden, 1st Earl of Avon
- Harold Macmillan, 1st Earl of Stockton
- Alec Douglas-Home, Baron Home of the Hirsel
- David Cameron, Lord Cameron of Chipping Norton
- Boris Johnson, former Prime Minister of the United Kingdom

Old Etonian politicians also include:

- Abhisit Vejjajiva, former Prime Minister of Thailand
- Kwasi Kwarteng, former Chancellor of the Exchequer
- Robert Cecil, 1st Viscount Cecil of Chelwood, recipient of the Nobel Peace Prize
- Lord Curzon, former Viceroy of India
- Victor Cavendish, 9th Duke of Devonshire, former Governor General of Canada
- Tam Dalyell, former Labour MP
- Rory Stewart, former Conservative MP, cabinet minister and diplomat
- Jacob Rees-Mogg, former Conservative MP and Leader of the House of Commons
- Thomas Nelson Jr., a signer of the United States Declaration of Independence as a representative of Virginia and a Founding Father of the United States
- Thomas Lynch Jr., a signer of the United States Declaration of Independence as a representative of South Carolina and a Founding Father of the United States

== Royalty and nobility ==
This is an incomplete list of pupils from aristocratic and royal families, some of whom have been sending their sons to Eton for generations.

=== British ===
- William, Prince of Wales (born 1982)
- Prince Harry, Duke of Sussex (born 1984)
- Prince Arthur of Connaught (1883–1938)
- Prince Henry, Duke of Gloucester (1900–1974)
- Prince Edward, Duke of Kent (born 1935)
- Prince William of Gloucester (1941–1972)
- Prince Michael of Kent (born 1942)
- Prince Richard, Duke of Gloucester (born 1944)
- George Lascelles, 7th Earl of Harewood (1923–2011), son of Mary, Princess Royal and Henry Lascelles, 6th Earl of Harewood
- Alexander Windsor, Earl of Ulster (born 1974)
- George Windsor, Earl of St Andrews (born 1962)
- Lord Frederick Windsor (born 1979)
- Edward Windsor, Lord Downpatrick (born 1988)
- Charles Armstrong-Jones, Viscount Linley (born 1999), son of David Armstrong-Jones, 2nd Earl of Snowdon and Serena Stanhope
- Samuel Chatto (born 1996), son of Lady Sarah Chatto and Daniel Chatto
- Arthur Chatto (born 1999), son of Lady Sarah Chatto and Daniel Chatto
- John Spencer, 8th Earl Spencer (1924–1992), father of Diana, Princess of Wales, and the maternal grandfather of William, Prince of Wales, and Prince Harry, Duke of Sussex
- Charles Spencer, 9th Earl Spencer (born 1964), brother of Diana, Princess of Wales
- David Cholmondeley, 7th Marquess of Cholmondeley (born 1960)
- James Ogilvy (born 1964), son of Princess Alexandra and Sir Angus Ogilvy
- Claude Bowes-Lyon, 14th Earl of Strathmore and Kinghorne (1855–1944), father of Queen Elizabeth the Queen Mother and the maternal grandfather of Queen Elizabeth II
- Hugh Grosvenor, 2nd Duke of Westminster (1879–1953)
- John Spencer-Churchill, 11th Duke of Marlborough (1926–2014)
- William Montagu-Douglas-Scott, 6th Duke of Buccleuch (1831–1914), paternal grandfather of Princess Alice, Duchess of Gloucester, as well as a maternal great-grandfather of Prince William of Gloucester and Prince Richard, Duke of Gloucester
- Walter Montagu-Douglas-Scott, 8th Duke of Buccleuch (1894–1973), brother of Princess Alice, Duchess of Gloucester
- Sir William Worsley, 4th Baronet (1890–1973), father of Katharine, Duchess of Kent
- Charles Wellesley, 9th Duke of Wellington (born 1945)
- Peregrine Cavendish, 12th Duke of Devonshire (born 1944)
- Henry Alan Walter Richard Percy, 11th Duke of Northumberland (1953–1995)
- George Percy, Earl Percy (born 1984), eldest son and heir-apparent of Ralph Percy, 12th Duke of Northumberland
- Charles Innes-Ker, 11th Duke of Roxburghe (born 1981)
- Lord William Beauchamp Nevill (1860–1939)

=== Foreign ===
- Prince Tokugawa Iesato (1863–1940)
- Aga Khan III (1877–1957)
- Prince Eustachy Sapieha (1881–1963)
- Prajadhipok, King Rama VII of Siam (1893–1941)
- Leopold III of Belgium (1901–1983)
- Prince Nicholas of Romania (1903–1978)
- Prince Bira of Siam (1914–1985), Formula One driver from 1950 to 1954
- Birendra of Nepal (1945–2001)
- Alexander, Crown Prince of Yugoslavia (born 1945)
- Zera Yacob Amha Selassie, Head of the Imperial House of Ethiopia
- Dipendra of Nepal (1971–2001)
- Prince Nirajan of Nepal (1978–2001)

== Writers ==
- Robert Bridges
- John Carter
- Cyril Connolly
- William Douglas Home
- Henry Fielding
- Ian Fleming
- Gilbert Frankau
- Thomas Gray
- Aldous Huxley
- Pico Iyer
- Montague Rhodes James
- Ronald Knox
- Richard Mason
- Douglas Murray
- Musa Okwonga
- Dillibe Onyeama
- George Orwell
- Anthony Powell
- Benedict Rattigan
- Leslie Stephen
- Andrew Robinson
- Percy Bysshe Shelley
- Osbert Sitwell
- Sacheverell Sitwell
- Horace Walpole
- Guy Walters

== Scientists ==
- Robert Boyle, chemist
- John Gurdon, biologist and Nobel laureate
- J. B. S. Haldane, biologist and statistician
- Henry Moseley, physicist
- John Maynard Smith, biologist and geneticist
- John William Strutt, 3rd Baron Rayleigh, physicist and Nobel laureate
- Stephen Wolfram, computer scientist
- Richard Wrangham, biological anthropologist

== Journalists ==
- Timothy Brinton, 1950s BBC newsreader and 1960s ITN newscaster
- Nicholas Coleridge, president of Condé Nast International and managing director of Condé Nast UK
- Geordie Greig, current editor of The Mail on Sunday
- Julian Haviland, former political editor of ITN and The Times
- David Jessel, BBC current affairs presenter
- Ludovic Kennedy, former ITN newscaster and BBC Panorama presenter
- James Landale, current BBC diplomatic correspondent
- Sebastian Mallaby, Paul A Volker fellow at the Council on Foreign Relations, author
- Charles Moore, Baron Moore of Etchingham, former editor of The Daily Telegraph
- Ferdinand Mount, former editor of The Spectator
- John Oaksey, former chief ITV and Channel 4 Racing commentator
- David Shukman, BBC science editor
- Corbet Woodall, 1960s BBC newsreader

== Actors ==
- Amrou Al-Kadhi
- Sebastian Armesto
- Michael Bentine
- Jeremy Brett
- John R. Buckmaster
- Christopher Cazenove
- Jeremy Child
- Jeremy Clyde
- Adetomiwa Edun
- Clement von Franckenstein
- Harry Hadden-Paton
- Nyasha Hatendi
- Jonah Hauer-King
- Charles Hawtrey
- Tom Hiddleston
- Hugh Laurie
- Damian Lewis
- Harry Lloyd
- Patrick Macnee
- Ian Ogilvy
- Julian Ovenden
- Eddie Redmayne
- John Standing
- Freddie Thorp
- Moray Watson
- Dominic West

== Music ==
- Thomas Arne, composer
- Gerald Hugh Tyrwhitt, 14th Lord Berners, composer and novelist
- George Butterworth, composer
- John Macleod Campbell Crum, priest and hymnwriter
- Thomas Dunhill, composer
- Victor Hely-Hutchinson, composer and conductor
- Frederick Septimus Kelly, musician and composer
- Humphrey Lyttelton, jazz trumpeter
- Hubert Parry, writer of the hymn "Jerusalem" and the coronation anthem "I was glad"
- Roger Quilter, composer
- Donald Tovey, musicologist
- Frank Turner, musician
- Atticus Ross, musician and film composer
- Philip Heseltine (pseudonym Peter Warlock), Anglo-Welsh composer and writer
- David Watson, music producer

== Others ==
- Charles Edward, Duke of Saxe-Coburg and Gotha, Nazi SA Obergruppenführer
- Francis Bertie, 1st Viscount Bertie of Thame, ambassador
- Thomas Bevan, soldier and cricketer
- Henry Blofeld, cricket commentator
- Beau Brummell, dandy
- Guy Burgess, diplomat and spy
- Julian Byng, 1st Viscount Byng of Vimy, WWI commander and Governor General of Canada
- Alan Clark, MP and author
- John Collier, painter
- James Colthurst, radiologist and friend of Diana, Princess of Wales
- Piers Courage, Formula 1 racing driver
- Charles Douglas-Home, 13th Earl of Home, father of Prime Minister Alec Douglas-Home
- Ranulph Fiennes, explorer
- Alexander Fiske-Harrison, bullfighter and author
- Timothy Gowers, mathematician
- Ivo Graham, comedian
- Bear Grylls, adventurer
- Sir Algernon Guinness, 3rd Baronet, racing driver
- Sir Kenelm Guinness, 4th Baronet, engineer
- Quintin Hogg, philanthropist
- William Inge, Dean of St Paul's Cathedral
- Brian Johnston, cricket commentator
- John Maynard Keynes, economist
- Arthur Kinnaird, 11th Lord Kinnaird, footballer and FA chairman
- Richard Layard, Baron Layard, economist
- Oliver Leese, WWII commander 8th Army
- Christopher Mallaby, British Ambassador
- Frederick Stanley Maude, WWI commander
- Stewart Menzies, WWII head of MI6
- Alexander Nix, CEO of Cambridge Analytica
- Nigel Oakes, CEO of Behavioural Dynamics Institute and SCL Group
- Lawrence Oates, Antarctic explorer
- Derek Parfit, philosopher
- Herbert Plumer, 1st Viscount Plumer, WWI commander
- Paul Raison, art historian and former chairman of Christie's
- Timothy Raison, MP and government minister
- Henry Rawlinson, 1st Baron Rawlinson, WWI commander, ultimately Commander-in-Chief, India
- Charles Studd, cricketer and missionary
- Justin Welby, Archbishop of Canterbury
- Henry Maitland Wilson, WWII commander
- Timothy Yates, theological educator, vicar and historian
- Humphrey Smith, owner of Samuel Smith Old Brewery

Thirty-seven Old Etonians have been awarded the Victoria Cross—the largest number to alumni of any school.
