= Cream Dior dress of Princess Margaret =

1951 birthday dress worn in England

- Designer: Dior
- Year: 1951
- Type: Off-the-shoulder couture gown
- Material: Silk organza over satin

Princess Margaret wore a cream-colored Dior dress for her 21st birthday commemorations at Sandringham House in 1951. The off-the-shoulder silk gown was created and customised by designer Christian Dior, whom Margaret became closely associated with. The princess was captured in the piece, dubbed one of her favourite dresses, by Cecil Beaton, with the portrait becoming one of the most memorable royal photographs of the twentieth century. The dress has been cited as a part of fashion history, and has been a part of the permanent collection at the Museum of London since 1968.

== Background ==
Princess Margaret originally met Dior during her first trip to Europe. Following his first fashion show in London, Dior put together a special presentation at the Embassy of France for members of the royal family, including Margaret, Queen Elizabeth II, Princess Marina, Duchess of Kent, and Princess Olga of Greece and Denmark. Dior admired the princess's style and described her as "very charming". In terms of dressing, her sister was expected to remain loyal to British brands, whereas Margaret could afford to take bolder risks with fashion. She subsequently became one of his first high-profile English clients. In 1951, Princess Margaret ordered her 21st birthday gown from the Dior's 'Oblique' line, an adaption of the 'Matinee Poetique' design that had been presented in the Spring/Summer collection.

== Design and debut ==
The dress is an embroidered, off-the-shoulder cream couture gown with chiffon sleeves, made of silk organza over satin, and featuring beads, mother-of-pearls, sequins and raffia detailing. The outfit is a two-piece, with the top consisting of boned bodice as well as a dropped shoulder sash. The seven-layer voluminous skirt, which is gathered into a 55 cm waist, has an inner layer of silk, three layers of netting, and two outer layers of organza. During the dress's customisation, Dior asked Margaret if she felt like a silver or gold person; she chose gold. As a result, the front panel is intricately embroidered with gold rhinestones. The use of synthetic materials permitted for specific colors and effects, and was considered a modern choice made by the princess for a royal event. This was Dior's intention, as he aimed to "mark a departure" from the simplistic fashions of wartime years. The raffia elements were in line with trends of the 1950s, with the dress embodying Dior's New Look, which reintroduced feminine features and voluminous skirts in a post-World War II era. Upon viewing the gown, the princess joked that the adornments resembled potato peelings.

Princess Margaret wore the dress to her birthday commemorations, which took place at Sandringham House. She was photographed in the gown by Cecil Beaton for her official birthday portrait; she was captured reclining on a plush red sofa with an ornate tapestry backdrop, wearing a five-strand pearl necklace. The photograph became one of the most famous royal portraits of the twentieth century. The princess rewore the dress two months later on 21 November 1951, where she was the guest of honour at a charity gala organised by the Cercle de l'Union interalliée in benefit of the Hertford British Hospital. The event took place at the Hôtel Perrinet de Jars in Paris, and had "the grandest names of the French aristocracy" in attendance. Princess Margaret accessorised the gown with a Cartier platinum and diamond tiara, a diamond necklace, two bracelets, and evening gloves. The princess later stated that the piece was her "favourite dress of all", keeping the gown for seventeen years before its donation to the Museum of London, which was then based at Kensington Palace.

== Legacy and exhibition ==
Princess Margaret, considered a fashion icon, remained a customer of Dior throughout her life, through the tenure of Yves Saint Laurent, transitioning from couture to ready-to-wear. In his autobiography, Dior wrote that Margaret "crystallised the whole popular frantic interest in royalty". Several Dior pieces were marketed 'as worn by Princess Margaret' after her purchase. Katie Frost for Harper's Bazaar, Katie Trotter of Vogue Arabia, Dean Mayo Davies from Another Magazine, and Brigit Katz of Smithsonian magazine all referred to both the gown and portrait as "iconic", with Katz calling the look "the vision of a princess." Beatrice Behlen, curator of the Museum of London, compared the dress's "sweeping lines" to Cinderella's ballgown. Vogue Arabia deemed the dress as one of the 10 most important moments in fashion history.

In 2019, the dress was loaned from the London Museum to the V&A Museum, as part of 'Dior in Britain' exhibition, covering the impact of his 'New Look'. A gala was held in January to mark the exhibit, attended by Princess Margaret's children, Lady Sarah Chatto and David Armstrong-Jones, Earl of Snowdon. The gown was the centrepiece of the exhibit, and had to be restored by curators upon its arrival, with conservator Emily Austin speculating that the wear-and-tear indicated that the gown was "well-loved". Harper's Bazaar called the dress "one of the standout dresses of the show". Upon viewing the exhibition, Another Magazine stated that "the gown wears beautifully the fragile passing of time – it has enjoyed itself, as it should – yet its intricate couture embroidery remains, bulletproof: you get what you pay for".

== See also ==
- Wedding dress of Princess Margaret
- Poltimore Tiara
- Coronation gown of Elizabeth II
- Travolta dress
- Revenge dress
- List of individual dresses
