= Arthur Chatto =

British personal trainer and Marine (born 1999)

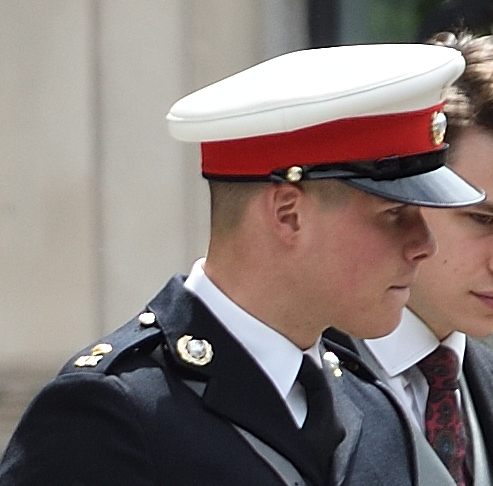
- Chatto in 2022
- Born: 5 February 1999 (age 27); London, England
- Education: University of Edinburgh
- Parents: Daniel Chatto (father); Lady Sarah Armstrong-Jones (mother)
- Relatives: Samuel Chatto (brother)
- Family: House of Windsor

Arthur Robert Nathaniel Chatto (born 5 February 1999) is a relative of the British royal family. Through his mother, Lady Sarah Chatto, he is a grandson of Princess Margaret, Countess of Snowdon. He worked as a personal trainer before joining the Royal Marines. He is also the youngest person to row around Great Britain. As of 2026, he is 32nd in the line of succession to the British throne.

== Biography ==
Arthur Robert Nathaniel Chatto was born on 5 February 1999, the second son of Lady Sarah Armstrong-Jones and Daniel Chatto. He has an older brother, Samuel. On his mother's side, he is a grandchild of Princess Margaret, Countess of Snowdon, and Antony Armstrong-Jones, 1st Earl of Snowdon, and a great-grandson of King George VI and Queen Elizabeth the Queen Mother. On his father's side, he is a grandson of actor Tom Chatto. He attended Westminster Cathedral Choir School and Eton College, where he served in the Combined Cadet Force, before going on to study geography at the University of Edinburgh. During his youth, Chatto served as a page to his great-aunt Queen Elizabeth II, carrying the tail of her gown during ceremonies including the knighting of William, Prince of Wales.

At 17, he climbed several mountains in the Alps, including the Matterhorn, Mont Blanc, and Gran Paradiso.

Chatto began creating social media posts in 2017, when he was 18, and was quickly dubbed "the next Prince Harry" by The Observer. He was the first member of the royal family to post shirtless pictures, and has been described as "the royal family's resident thirst trapper". In 2019, he hiked Lochnagar, posting a photo of it. As of 2021, he had more than two hundred thousand followers.

He worked as a personal trainer at Bound Fitness in Edinburgh, a gym that emphasises mental health, and became a brand ambassador for Elliott Brown Watches and mountaineering clothing brand Jotnar.

Chatto spent six months training for a charity row, the Great Britain row challenge, which he completed during COVID with two close friends he was living with as they trained. They were the only team to complete it that year due to COVID. The row took 42 days and covered 2,000 miles. They became the youngest team ever to row around Great Britain, and he became the youngest person to row around the mainland, a record recognised by Guinness World Record. He raised more than £21,000 for the British Red Cross and ocean cleanup charity Just One Ocean.

He was accepted into the Royal Marines training programme in 2021. After joining, he reduced his attendance at royal events and deleted his social media accounts.

Chatto has commented on the British television series The Crown, saying that it is "only an interpretation" and that he "doesn't let the TV persona mar my judgement of any of them". He plays the bagpipes.

As of 2026, he is 32nd in the line of succession to the British throne.

== Ancestry ==
Ancestors of Arthur Chatto

16. James Sproule
8. James St. George Sproule MC
17. Mary Smith
4. Tom Chatto
18. Thomas Chatto (Note: Illegitimate son of the publisher Andrew Chatto and his mistress Catherine Heard.)
9. Gladys Muriel Chatto
19. Helen Francis Laybourn
2. Daniel Chatto (Note: In 2012, The Daily Telegraph claimed that Daniel Chatto's biological father was the theatrical agent Robin Fox.)
20. William Grimwood Thompson
10. Jesse Pearson Thompson
21. Charlotte Naomi Hollingum
5. Rosalind Joan Thompson
22. Thomas Beer
11. Ophelia Rosaline Beer
23. Fanny Ashplant
1. Arthur Chatto
24. Sir Robert Armstrong-Jones
12. Ronald Armstrong-Jones
25. Margaret Roberts
6. Antony Armstrong-Jones, 1st Earl of Snowdon
26. Leonard Charles Rudolph Messel
13. Anne Messel
27. Maud Sambourne
3. Sarah Armstrong-Jones
28. King George V
14. King George VI
29. Mary of Teck
7. Princess Margaret
30. Claude Bowes-Lyon, 14th Earl of Strathmore and Kinghorne
15. Elizabeth Bowes-Lyon
31. Cecilia Cavendish-Bentinck

Arthur Chatto Born: 5 February 1999
Lines of succession
Preceded by Samuel Chatto	Line of succession to the British throne 32nd in line	Succeeded by Prince Richard, Duke of Gloucester
