= Samuel Chatto =

British artist and royal family member (born 1996)

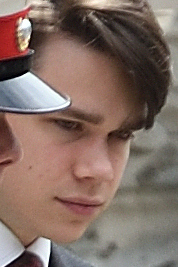
- Chatto in 2022
- Born: 28 July 1996 (age 30); London, United Kingdom
- Education: University of Edinburgh
- Parents: Daniel Chatto (father); Lady Sarah Armstrong-Jones (mother)
- Relatives: Arthur Chatto (brother)
- Family: House of Windsor

Samuel Chatto (born 28 July 1996) is a member of the extended British royal family as the elder son of Lady Sarah Chatto and Daniel Chatto. Through his mother, he is a grandson of Princess Margaret, Countess of Snowdon and a great-nephew of Queen Elizabeth II. As of 2026, he is 31st in the line of succession to the British throne.

== Early life and education ==
Samuel Chatto was born on 28 July 1996 at Portland Hospital, London, the eldest child of Lady Sarah Armstrong-Jones and Daniel Chatto, both of whom are artists. On his mother's side, he is the eldest grandchild of Princess Margaret, Countess of Snowdon, and Antony Armstrong-Jones, 1st Earl of Snowdon, a great-nephew of Queen Elizabeth II, and a great-grandson of King George VI and Queen Elizabeth the Queen Mother. On his father's side, he is a grandson of actor Tom Chatto. He has a younger brother, Arthur, with whom he attended Eton College.

Chatto was christened at the Royal Chapel of All Saints, Windsor Park, on 1 February 1997, witnessed by his maternal great-grandmother, Queen Elizabeth the Queen Mother. He wore the original royal christening gown.

Chatto studied at the University of Edinburgh and graduated in 2018 with a degree in art history. From 2019 to 2020, he attended the Royal Drawing School.

=== Career ===
Chatto is interested in pottery and completed a six-week apprenticeship at North Shore Pottery, a studio in Scotland. He has a home studio and has sold his creations on his own website. He has spent time in Japan to learn pottery techniques. His work has been displayed in various places, including a restaurant in Somerset and art galleries in Norway and Japan. In 2019, he spent six weeks in India to complete 200 hours of training to become a yoga instructor.

== Public appearances ==
Chatto does not have any official royal duties, but has attended several major royal events, including the state funeral of Elizabeth II, the coronation of Charles III and Camilla, and the wedding of Prince Harry and Meghan Markle. He also attended a banquet during the state visit by Japanese Emperor Naruhito to the United Kingdom in 2024.

He attends Christmas services with the royal family at St Mary Magdalene Church, Sandringham, and attended the annual Queen's Christmas Lunch at Buckingham Palace.

== Personal life ==
Chatto began a relationship with Eleanor Ekserdjian in 2021, an artist who also studied at the University of Edinburgh and appeared at London Fashion Week. She is the daughter of David Ekserdjian. In July 2026, they announced their engagement. He made Ekserdjian's porcelain engagement ring.

As of 2026, Chatto is 31st in the line of succession to the British throne.

Samuel Chatto Born: 28 July 1996
Lines of succession
Preceded by Lady Sarah Chatto	Line of succession to the British throne 31st in line	Succeeded by Arthur Chatto
