= Wedding dress of Princess Margaret of the United Kingdom =

Dress worn by Princess Margaret at her wedding to Antony Armstrong-Jones in 1960

Wedding dress of Princess Margaret
- Designer: Norman Hartnell
- Year: 1960
- Type: Silk organza wedding dress

The wedding dress of Britain's Princess Margaret was worn at her wedding to photographer Antony Armstrong-Jones on 6 May 1960 at Westminster Abbey.

== The dress ==
The wedding dress was designed by Norman Hartnell, the favoured couturier of the British royal family, and was made from silk organza. The skirt comprised some 30 metres of fabric. Hartnell specifically kept the adornments of the dress such as the crystal embellishments and beading to a minimum in order to suit Margaret's petite frame.

The dress now belongs to the British Royal Collection and is part of a display of royal wedding dresses at Kensington Palace in London.

== Critical appraisal ==
Vogue described the dress as "stunningly tailored". Another author called it "a study in simplicity". In 1960, Life magazine named it "the simplest royal wedding gown in history". It has also been described as one of Hartnell's most beautiful and sophisticated pieces.

== See also ==
- List of individual dresses
