= Westminster Cathedral Choir School =

Location
- Ambrosden Avenue; London, Greater London, SW1P 1QH; England; 51.49617°N 0.13973°W

Information
- Type: Private preparatory school Day and boarding school Cathedral school
- Motto: Laudate Pueri Dominum
- Religious affiliation: Roman Catholic
- Established: 1902; 124 years ago
- Local authority: City of Westminster
- Department for Education URN: 101166 Tables
- President: Cardinal Vincent Nichols, Archbishop of Westminster
- Head Master: Neil McLaughlan
- Gender: Boys
- Age: 4 to 13
- Enrolment: 270
- Houses: Manning, Wisemen and Vaughan
- Colour
- Diocese: Westminster
- Website: www.choirschool.com

Westminster Cathedral Choir School is a boarding and day preparatory school for about 270 boys in the area of Victoria in the City of Westminster. It is one of two Roman Catholic cathedral schools in the United Kingdom, the other being St John's in Cardiff, Wales.

== Curriculum ==
The school curriculum was rated as Excellent in the 2018 inspection. Many past pupils have gained entrance to some of the country's best private schools including Eton College, Harrow School, St Paul's School and Westminster School.

Besides music, boys are taught English, maths, science, etc. and are required to learn French and Latin. In Year 8, pupils are prepared for the Common Entrance Examination.

== Notable former pupils ==
- Colin Mawby (1936-2019) – conductor, organist, composer
- Michael Berkeley (b. 1948) – composer, broadcaster
- Arthur Chatto (b. 1999) - great-nephew of, and Page of Honour to, Elizabeth II; thirty-first in line to the throne.
- John Landor – conductor
