= Lady Sarah Chatto =

British royal family member (born 1964)

- Born: Lady Sarah Frances Elizabeth Armstrong-Jones; 1 May 1964 (age 62); Kensington Palace, London, England
- Education: Bedales School; Camberwell School of Art; Middlesex Polytechnic
- Occupation: Painter
- Spouse: Daniel Chatto (m. 1994)
- Children: Samuel and Arthur Chatto
- Parents: Princess Margaret of the United Kingdom; Antony Armstrong-Jones, 1st Earl of Snowdon
- Family: Armstrong-Jones family; House of Windsor

Lady Sarah Frances Elizabeth Chatto (née Armstrong-Jones; born 1 May 1964) is a member of the British royal family. She is the only daughter of Princess Margaret, Countess of Snowdon, and Antony Armstrong-Jones, 1st Earl of Snowdon. She and her brother, David Armstrong-Jones, 2nd Earl of Snowdon, are the only maternal first cousins of King Charles III. At her birth, she was 7th in line to the British throne; as of 2026 she is 30th. Though she does not undertake public duties, she frequently attends events and ceremonies with the wider royal family.

== Early life and education ==
Lady Sarah Frances Elizabeth Armstrong-Jones was born at 8:20 am on 1 May 1964 at Kensington Palace in London. She is the second child and only daughter of Princess Margaret and Antony Armstrong-Jones, 1st Earl of Snowdon. She was baptised in the private chapel at Buckingham Palace on 13 July.

Armstrong-Jones is a godmother to Prince Harry, Duke of Sussex, Lady Rose Gilman, and Lady Louise Windsor. She also has half-siblings on her father's side: Polly Fry (born 1960), Lady Frances Armstrong-Jones (born 1979), and Jasper Cable-Alexander (born 1998).

Armstrong-Jones and her brother, David, then Viscount Linley, grew up in the nursery of Kensington Palace, Apartment 10. (Note: Their mother moved to 1A, after divorcing Snowdon, while Prince and Princess Michael of Kent took Apartment 10.) They were raised with a nanny called Verona Sumner, although their parents, especially their father, were comparatively hands-on (for the time), with their father teaching them to build things and be creative.

Their parents' marriage was fractious; the couple formally separated when Armstrong-Jones was 12 and divorced when she was 14. She and her brother spent weekends, depending on with which parent, at either Nymans or Royal Lodge. Holidays were given to the royal estates at Sandringham and Balmoral, where Armstrong-Jones did landscape painting.

Armstrong-Jones was a bridesmaid at the wedding of her cousin Charles, Prince of Wales, and Lady Diana Spencer. She accompanied her mother and brother on an official visit to China and Hong Kong in May 1987.

She attended Bedales School, which she left with a single A level in Art. She enrolled at the Camberwell School of Art. She also studied art at the Royal Academy Schools. She then spent two years in India with her father, where he was employed to photograph the production of A Passage to India. The film's producer, her relative John Knatchbull, 7th Baron Brabourne (son-in-law of Louis Mountbatten, 1st Earl Mountbatten of Burma), gave her a job as an intern assisting the wardrobe department and studying wood gilding under her father's cousin Thomas Messel. Returning to England, she enrolled in a two-year course in textile and fabric design at Middlesex Polytechnic (later renamed as Middlesex University).

== Marriage and children ==
Armstrong-Jones met Daniel Chatto during her years in India with her father in the 1980s. Chatto was working on another British film, Heat and Dust. He is from a theatrical family, the son of actor Tom Chatto (1920–1982) and the theatrical agent Ros Chatto (born Rosalind Joan Thompson; died 2012). He proposed to her with a "vintage cluster ring."

The couple married on 14 July 1994; the Reverend Chad Varah, founder of the Samaritans, officiated at the wedding, held at St Stephen's, Walbrook in the City of London. The bride's wedding gown was designed by Jasper Conran. Her bridesmaids were half-sister Lady Frances, Zara Phillips (daughter of her first cousin Princess Anne), and Tara Noble-Singh, a family friend.

The couple have two sons:

- Samuel David Benedict Chatto (born 28 July 1996), 31st in the line of succession as of September 2025. He studied at Eton, and went on to study history of art at the University of Edinburgh, and works as a sculptor, based in West Sussex. He also completed yoga teacher training in India.
- Arthur Robert Nathaniel Chatto (born 5 February 1999), 32nd in the line of succession, and a former page of honour to Queen Elizabeth II, his great-aunt, from 2009 to 2015. He initially attended Westminster Cathedral Choir School before going to Eton College. He then studied geography at the University of Edinburgh, and at the same time worked as a personal trainer. As of June 2022, he was serving with the Royal Marines.

== Professional life ==
Chatto has been exhibiting her work, always under the name Sarah Armstrong-Jones, at The Redfern Gallery since 1995. Her work has won awards: the Winsor & Newton Prize in 1988 and the Creswick Landscape Prize in 1990.

In 2004, she became vice president of the Royal Ballet, of which her mother had been president. She was named president in 2024.

Chatto does not undertake public duties and is not considered a "working royal". However, it has been reported that she was close to her aunt Queen Elizabeth II. Chatto is frequently seen attending public events such as jubilees and funerals, as well as semi-private royal family events, such as the Sandringham Christmas service, with her sons.

== Coat of arms ==
Coat of arms of Lady Sarah Chatto
Notes Lady Sarah bears her father's arms on a lozenge. Coronet Lady Sarah is entitled to use the coronet of a female-line grandchild of the sovereign. Escutcheon Sable on a chevron argent, between in chief two fleurs-de-lis Or, and in base an eagle displayed Or, four pallets gules.

== Notes ==
Lady Sarah Chatto Born: 1 May 1964
Lines of succession
Preceded by Lady Margarita Armstrong-Jones	Line of succession to the British throne 30th in line	Succeeded by Samuel Chatto
Orders of precedence in the United Kingdom
Preceded by Princess Michael of Kent	Ladies; Lady Sarah Chatto	Succeeded by Princess Alexandra, The Hon. Lady Ogilvy
