= Princess Margaret, Countess of Snowdon =

British princess (1930–2002)

Princess Margaret
- Countess of Snowdon
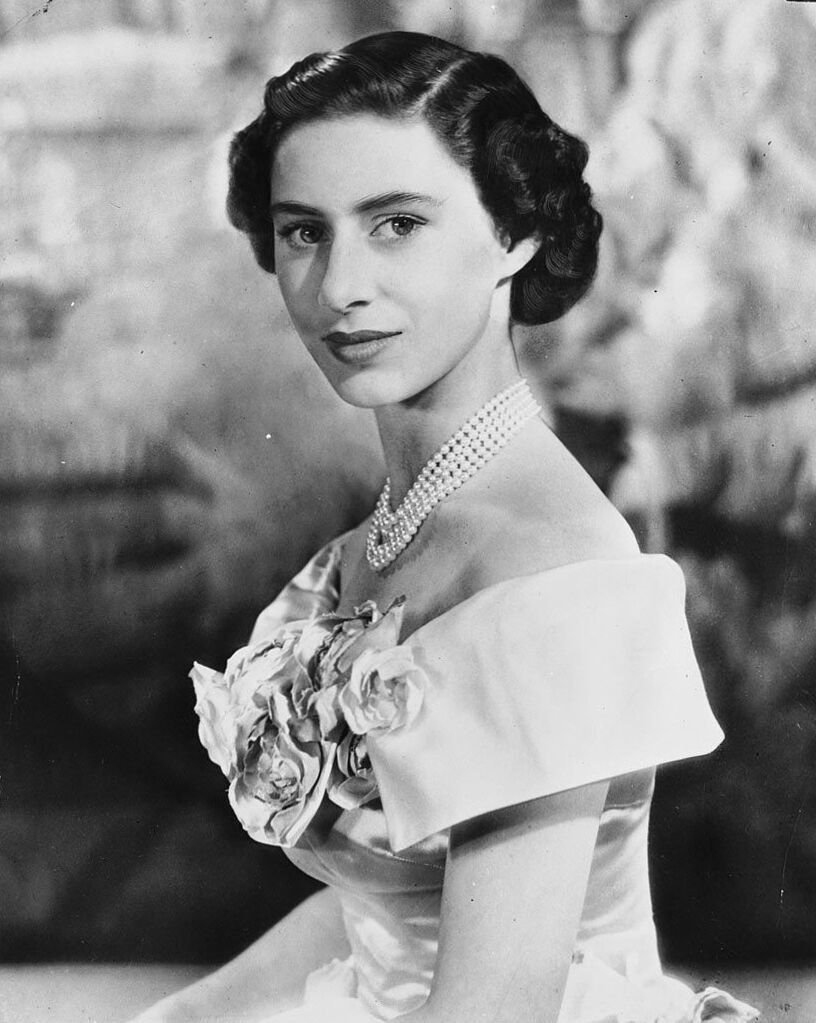
- Formal portrait, 1950
- Born: Princess Margaret Rose of York; 21 August 1930; Glamis Castle, Angus, Scotland
- Died: 9 February 2002 (aged 71); King Edward VII's Hospital, London, England
- Burial: 15 February 2002 Ashes placed in the Royal Vault, St George's Chapel 9 April 2002 Ashes interred in the King George VI Memorial Chapel, St George's Chapel
- Spouse: Antony Armstrong-Jones, 1st Earl of Snowdon (m. 1960; div. 1978)
- Issue: David Armstrong-Jones, 2nd Earl of Snowdon; Lady Sarah Chatto
- House: Windsor
- Father: George VI
- Mother: Elizabeth Bowes-Lyon

Princess Margaret, Countess of Snowdon (Margaret Rose; 21 August 1930 – 9 February 2002), was the younger daughter of King George VI and Queen Elizabeth the Queen Mother, and the only sibling of Queen Elizabeth II. Born when her parents were the Duke and Duchess of York, she became second in line to the British throne after her father's accession in 1936, though her place in the succession declined as her sister's children and grandchildren were born.

Margaret spent much of her childhood with her family and elder sister. During the Second World War, she remained at Windsor Castle despite suggestions that she and Elizabeth should be evacuated to Canada. Too young to perform official duties, she continued her education while her sister undertook public responsibilities. Her father's death in 1952, which brought Elizabeth to the throne, marked a turning point in Margaret's life and coincided with her relationship with RAF officer Peter Townsend.

Celebrated for her glamour and social life, Margaret attracted widespread attention in the 1950s for her romance with Peter Townsend, her father's equerry, which she ended under pressure from government and church. In 1960, she married photographer Antony Armstrong-Jones, later Earl of Snowdon, with whom she had two children, David and Sarah, before their divorce in 1978. Margaret's private life, including her reputed romances and social circle, was often the subject of speculation by the press.

Her divorce and lifestyle drew controversy, and she became a symbol of both royal modernity and scandal. A heavy smoker, her health declined in later years, and from 1998, she suffered a series of strokes. She died in 2002, aged 71, following another stroke. She is remembered as one of the most glamorous and controversial members of the British royal family.

== Early life ==
Margaret was born at 9:22 pm on 21 August 1930 by Caesarean section at Glamis Castle in Scotland, her mother's ancestral home. She was the younger daughter and second child of Prince Albert, Duke of York (later King George VI), and Elizabeth, Duchess of York (later Queen Elizabeth the Queen Mother). Within the royal family she was affectionately known as "Margot".

Margaret was the first British princess or prince to be born in Scotland since Robert Stuart, Duke of Kintyre, in 1602. She was delivered by Sir Henry Simson, the royal obstetrician, with the Home Secretary, J. R. Clynes, in attendance to verify the birth. Registration of the birth was delayed for several days to avoid her being number 13 in the parish register. She was baptised in the private chapel at Buckingham Palace on 30 October by Cosmo Lang, the Archbishop of Canterbury. (Note: Her godparents were: the Prince of Wales (her paternal uncle, for whom his brother Prince George stood proxy); Princess Ingrid of Sweden (her paternal cousin, for whom another cousin, Lady Patricia Ramsay, stood proxy); Princess Victoria (her paternal great-aunt); Lady Rose Leveson-Gower (her maternal aunt); and the Hon David Bowes-Lyon (her maternal uncle).)

At the time of her birth, Margaret was fourth in the line of succession to the British throne. Her father was the second son of King George V and Queen Mary, and her mother was the youngest daughter of Claude Bowes-Lyon, 14th Earl of Strathmore and Kinghorne, and Cecilia Bowes-Lyon, Countess of Strathmore and Kinghorne. The Duchess of York originally wished to name her second daughter Ann Margaret, writing to Queen Mary: "I am very anxious to call her Ann Margaret, as I think Ann of York sounds pretty, & Elizabeth and Ann go so well together." George V disliked the name Ann but approved the alternative, Margaret Rose. By the end of 1948, she had ceased using her middle name.

Margaret's early life was spent mainly at the Yorks' residences at 145 Piccadilly, their London town house, and at Royal Lodge in Windsor. The family were widely regarded by the public as an ideal domestic unit, but unfounded rumours that Margaret was deaf and mute persisted until her first major public appearance at her uncle Prince George's wedding in 1934.

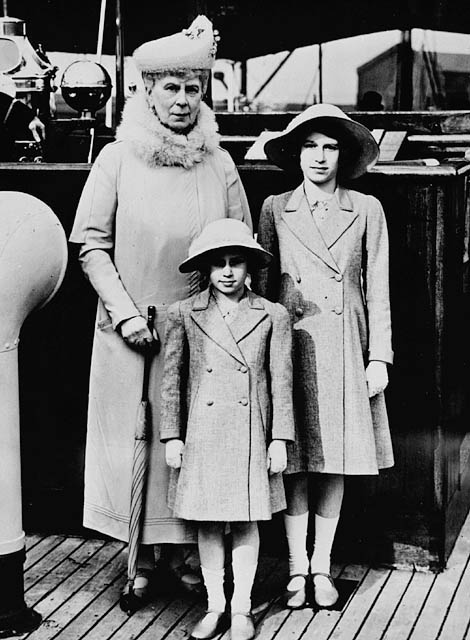
Margaret (front) with her grandmother Mary and sister Elizabeth, May 1939

Margaret was educated alongside her sister, Princess Elizabeth, by their Scottish governess, Marion Crawford. Her education was supervised largely by her mother, who, in the words of Randolph Churchill, "never aimed at bringing her daughters up to be more than nicely behaved young ladies". When Queen Mary emphasised the importance of education, the Duchess of York replied, "I don't know what she meant. After all I and my sisters only had governesses and we all married well – one of us very well". Margaret later expressed resentment about her limited education and directed criticism towards her mother. However, the Duchess told a friend that she "regretted" that her daughters did not go to school like other children, and the decision to employ a governess rather than send the girls to school may have been taken at the insistence of their grandfather George V. J. M. Barrie, author of Peter Pan, read stories to the sisters during their childhood.

Margaret's grandfather died in January 1936, and her uncle acceded to the throne as Edward VIII. Less than a year later, in December 1936, Edward abdicated to marry Wallis Simpson, a twice-divorced American whom neither the Church of England nor the Dominion governments would accept as queen. The Church did not recognise the marriage of a divorced woman with a living former husband as valid. Edward's abdication obliged Margaret's father to assume the throne, and Margaret became second in line, with the title The Princess Margaret to indicate her status as a child of the sovereign. The family moved into Buckingham Palace, where Margaret's room overlooked The Mall.

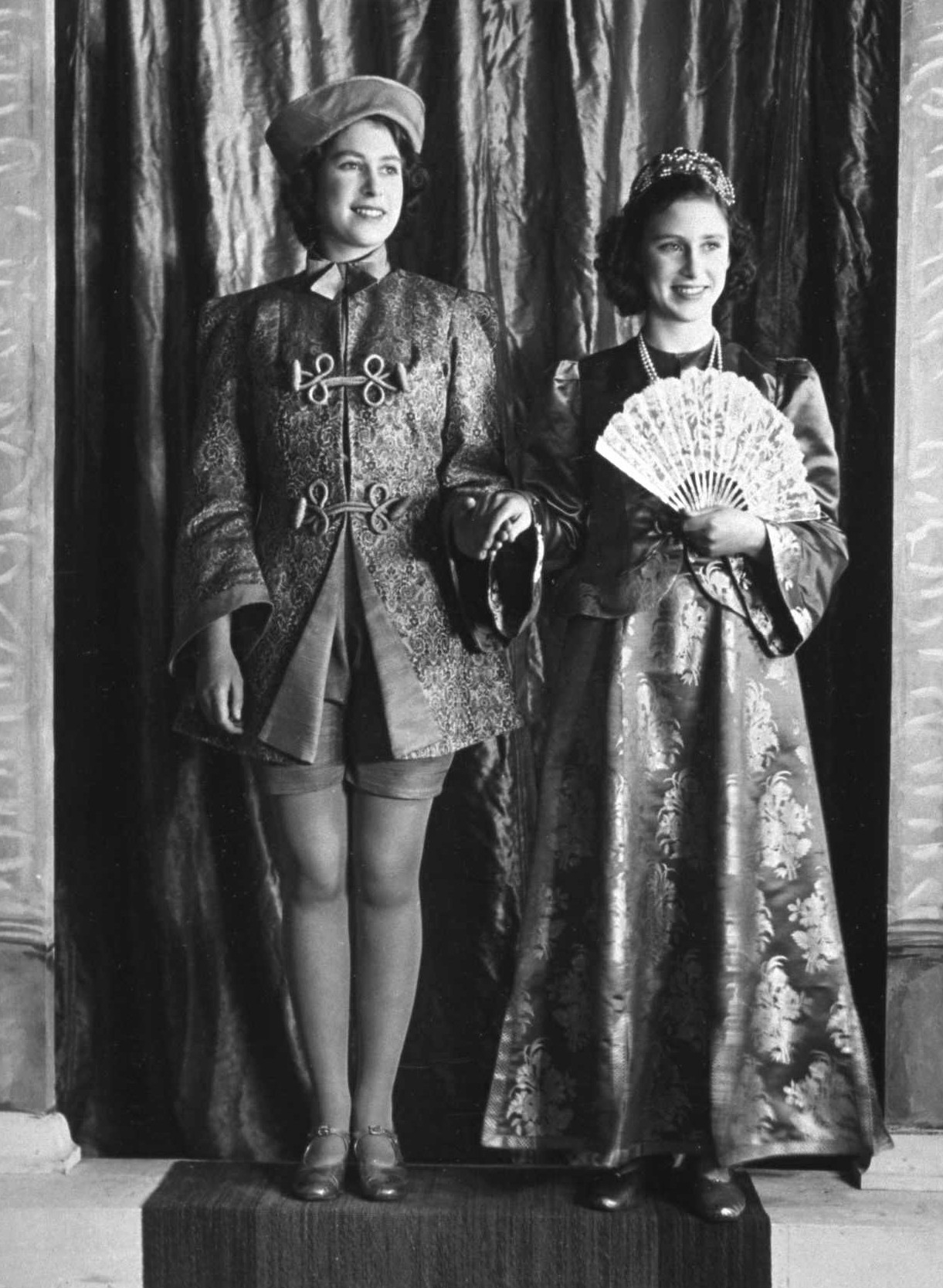
Elizabeth and Margaret performing at Windsor Castle in a 1943 production of the pantomime Aladdin

Margaret was a Brownie in the 1st Buckingham Palace Brownie Pack, formed in 1937. She later became a Girl Guide and then a Sea Ranger, and she served as President of Girlguiding UK from 1965 until her death.

At the outbreak of World War II, Margaret and Elizabeth were at Birkhall, on the Balmoral Castle estate, where they remained until Christmas 1939, enduring nights so cold that the drinking water in carafes by their bedsides froze. They spent Christmas at Sandringham House before moving to Windsor Castle, just outside London, for much of the remainder of the war. Lord Hailsham wrote to Winston Churchill recommending that the princesses be evacuated to the greater safety of Canada, to which their mother famously replied, "The children won't go without me. I won't leave without the King. And the King will never leave." At Windsor, the princesses staged pantomimes at Christmas in aid of the Queen's Wool Fund, which bought yarn to be knitted into military garments. In 1940, Margaret sat beside Elizabeth during their radio broadcast for the BBC's Children's Hour, addressing children who had been evacuated from cities; Margaret spoke at the end, wishing the listeners goodnight.

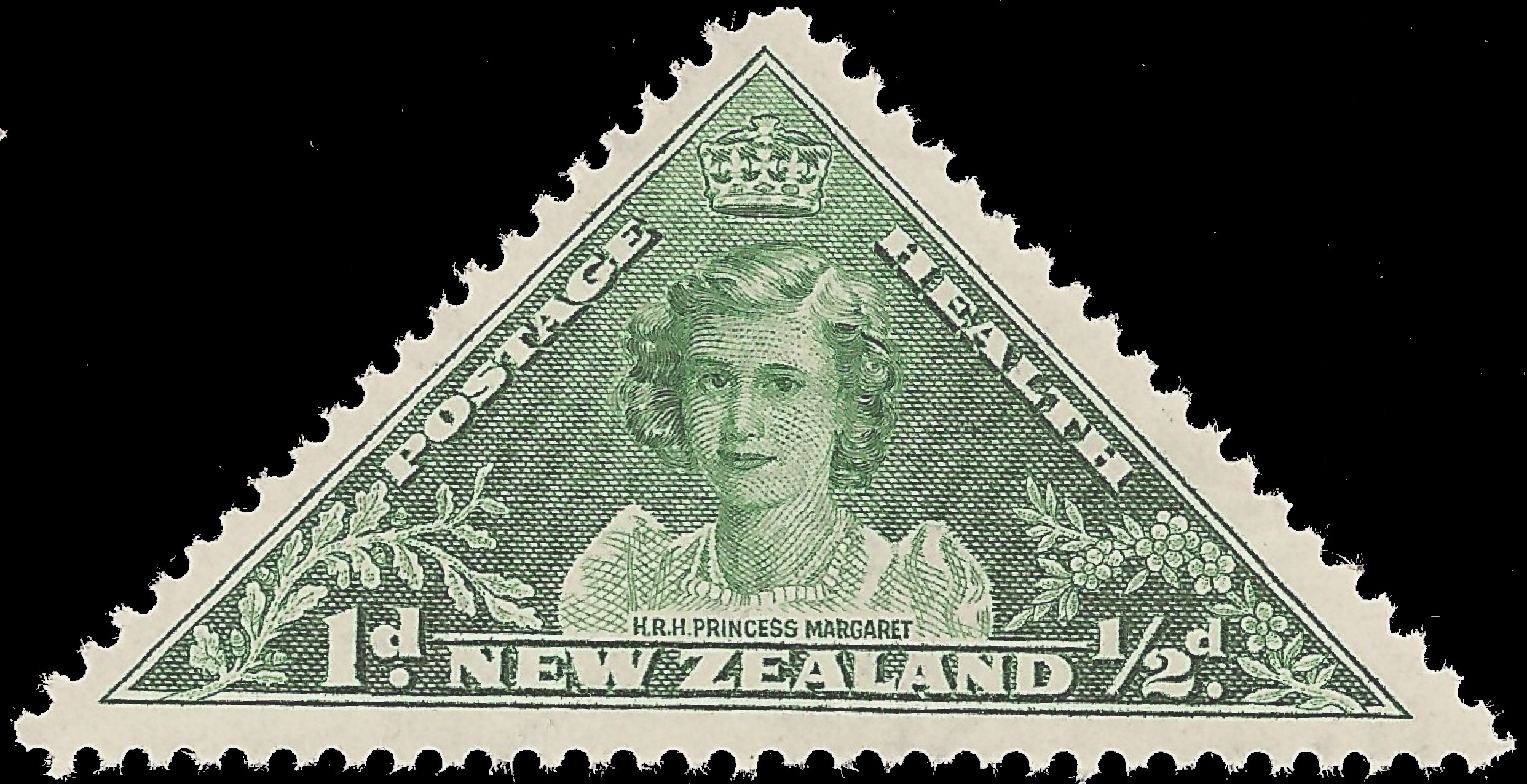
Margaret appeared on a 1943 postage stamp in New Zealand

Unlike other members of the royal family, Margaret was not expected to undertake public or official duties during the war. She developed her skills in singing and playing the piano, often performing show tunes from stage musicals. Her contemporaries thought she was spoiled by her parents, especially her father, who allowed her liberties not usually permitted, such as staying up to dinner at the age of 13.

Crawford despaired at the attention Margaret received, writing to friends: "Could you this year only ask Princess Elizabeth to your party? ... Princess Margaret does draw all the attention and Princess Elizabeth lets her do that." Elizabeth, however, did not mind, remarking, "Oh, it's so much easier when Margaret's there – everybody laughs at what Margaret says". Their father described Elizabeth as his pride and Margaret as his joy. When Elizabeth joined the Auxiliary Territorial Service in 1945, Margaret became extremely jealous, lamenting, "I was born too late!" as she was too young to join herself.

== Post-war years ==
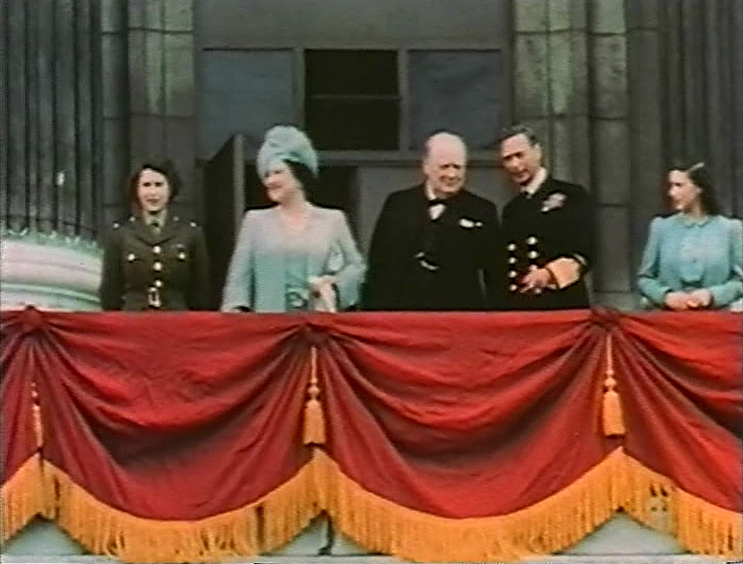
Margaret (far right) on the balcony of Buckingham Palace with her family and Winston Churchill, 8 May 1945

Margaret appeared on the balcony at Buckingham Palace with her family and Winston Churchill at the end of the war in 1945. Afterwards, both Margaret and Elizabeth joined the crowds outside the palace, incognito, chanting, "We want the King, we want the Queen!" Mingling with ordinary people, they danced the hokey cokey, the Lambeth Walk, and the conga. "I remember lines of unknown people linking arms and walking down Whitehall, and all of us were swept along by tides of happiness and relief," Elizabeth later recalled. Margaret and Elizabeth were "terrified" of being recognised, so they did their best to remain hidden in plain sight during the celebrations.

On 15 April 1946, Margaret was confirmed into the Church of England. On 1 February 1947, she, Elizabeth, and their parents embarked on a state tour of Southern Africa. The three-month visit was Margaret's first trip abroad. She later claimed that she remembered "every minute of it", including rides on horseback taken by her and Elizabeth using horses lent by locals near the royal train. Her chaperon on those occasions was Peter Townsend, the King's equerry, who it was noticed, could be quite sharp with Margaret. In November 1947, Margaret was a bridesmaid at the wedding of Elizabeth and Philip Mountbatten. Over the next three years, Elizabeth and Philip had two children, Prince Charles and Princess Anne, whose births moved Margaret further down the line of succession.

In 1950, the former royal governess, Marion Crawford, published an unauthorised biography of Elizabeth's and Margaret's childhood, The Little Princesses, in which she described Margaret's "light-hearted fun and frolics" and her "amusing and outrageous ... antics".

=== The Margaret Set ===
Around the time of Elizabeth's wedding, the press began to follow the social life of the "unconventional" Margaret and her reputation for vivacity and wit. A young woman with "vivid blue eyes", Margaret enjoyed socialising with high society and young aristocrats, including Sharman Douglas, the daughter of the American ambassador, Lewis Williams Douglas. A celebrated beauty known for her glamour and fashion sense, she was often featured in the press at balls, parties, and nightclubs with friends who became known as the Margaret Set. Her official engagements increased, including a tour of Italy, Switzerland, and France, and she joined a growing number of charitable organisations as president or patron.

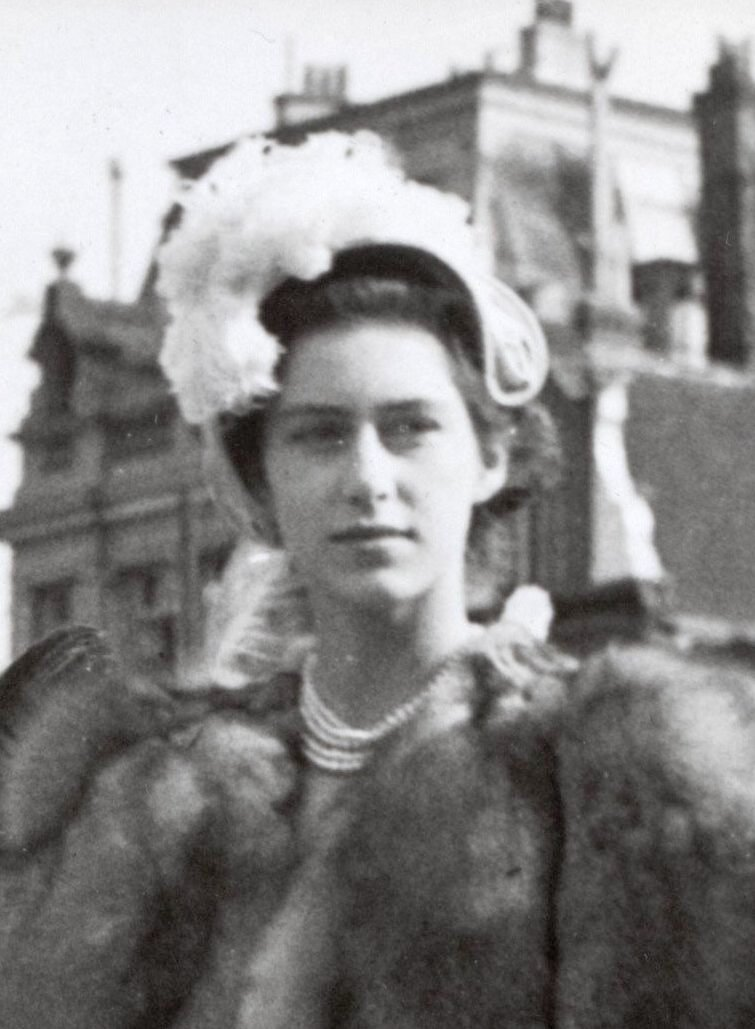
Margaret in Amsterdam, Netherlands in 1948

Favoured haunts of the Margaret Set were The 400 Club, the Café de Paris, and the Mirabelle restaurant. Anticipation of an engagement or romance between Margaret and a member of her circle was often reported. In 1948, international speculation suggested that her engagement to the Marquess of Blandford would be announced on her 18th birthday. Similar rumours later focused on the Hon. Peter Ward, then Billy Wallace, and others. The set also mixed with celebrities, including Danny Kaye, whom Margaret met after watching him perform at the London Palladium in February 1948; he was soon accepted by the royal social circle. In July 1949, at a fancy-dress ball at the US ambassador's residence, Margaret performed the can-can on stage, accompanied by Douglas and 10 other costumed girls. A press frenzy followed, with Kaye denying that he had taught Margaret the dance. Press interest could be intrusive: during a private visit to Paris in 1951, Margaret and Prince Nicholas of Yugoslavia were followed into a nightclub by a paparazzo who photographed them until British detectives physically removed him.

In 1952, although Margaret attended parties and debutante balls with friends such as Douglas and Mark Bonham Carter, the set were seen together less frequently. They regrouped for Coronation‑season social events. In May 1953, Margaret met singer Eddie Fisher when he performed at the Red, White, and Blue Ball; she invited him to her table and he was "invited to all sorts of parties". Margaret fell out with him in 1957, but Fisher later claimed that the night he met her was the greatest thrill of his life. In June 1954, the set performed the Edgar Wallace play The Frog at the Scala Theatre. Organised by Margaret's close friend Judy Montagu with Margaret as assistant director, it was praised for raising £10,500 for charity but criticised for its amateur performances. By the mid‑1950s, although still seen at fashionable nightspots and theatre premieres, the set had dwindled as its members married. As Margaret reached her late twenties unmarried, the press increasingly shifted from predicting whom she might marry to speculating that she might remain a spinster.

=== 'Romances' and the press (1947–1959) ===
The press avidly discussed "the world's most eligible bachelor-girl" and her alleged romances with more than 30 bachelors, including David Mountbatten (her brother-in-law's first cousin and best man), Michael I of Romania, Dominic Elliot, Colin Tennant (later Baron Glenconner), Prince Henry of Hesse-Kassel, and future Canadian prime minister John Turner. Most had titles and almost all were wealthy. Lord Blandford and Lord Dalkeith, both wealthy sons of dukes, were considered the likeliest potential husbands. Her family reportedly hoped that Margaret would marry Dalkeith, but, unlike him, she had no interest in outdoor pursuits. Billy Wallace, sole heir to a £2.8 million (about £64 million today) fortune and an old friend, was reportedly Margaret's favourite companion during the mid‑1950s.

During her 21st birthday party at Balmoral in August 1951, the press were disappointed to photograph Margaret only with Townsend, who was frequently seen in the background of royal engagements and was, to her parents, a trusted companion as Elizabeth's duties increased. The following month, her father underwent surgery for lung cancer, and Margaret was appointed one of the counsellors of State who undertook the King's official duties while he was incapacitated. Her father died five months later, on 6 February 1952, and her sister acceded as Elizabeth II.

== Romance with Peter Townsend ==
=== Early relationship ===
During the war, the King suggested appointing palace aides who were highly qualified men from the military rather than relying solely on aristocrats. Told that a handsome war hero had arrived, Margaret and Elizabeth met Peter Townsend, the new equerry, on his first day at Buckingham Palace in 1944; Elizabeth reportedly told her 13‑year‑old sister, "Bad luck, he's married". A temporary three‑month assignment from the RAF became permanent. The King and Queen were fond of Townsend; the King is said to have regarded the calm and efficient war veteran as the son he never had. He may also have been aware of Margaret's early infatuation with the non‑titled and non‑wealthy Townsend, reportedly observing the courtier reluctantly obey her instruction to carry her up the palace stairs after a party.

Townsend was so frequently near Margaret that gossip columnists overlooked him as a potential suitor. When their relationship began is unclear. Margaret told friends she fell in love with him during the 1947 South Africa tour, where they often went riding together. Her biographer Craig Brown recorded that, according to a National Trust curator, Townsend requested the bedroom next to hers during a trip to Belfast in October 1947. In September 1948, they attended the inauguration of Queen Juliana of the Netherlands. In later life, Townsend admitted that there was an attraction between them at this point, though neither acknowledged it to the other. Soon afterwards, he discovered that his wife, Rosemary was involved in an extramarital affair, which ended. Contemporary anecdotes about their closeness then faded until late 1950, when their friendship appears to have rekindled, coinciding with Townsend's appointment as Deputy Master of the Household and the breakdown of his marriage.

From spring 1951, several accounts described a growing romantic attachment. A footman recalled how the King diverted the pair's picnic plans, adding that whatever the King and Queen knew about the developing relationship, most royal staff noticed it as it was obvious to them. Townsend said that his love for Margaret began at Balmoral in 1951, and remembered an incident that August when the princess woke him from a nap after a picnic lunch while the King watched, suggesting the King was aware. Townsend and his wife separated in 1951, a fact noticed by the press by July.

Margaret was grief-stricken by her father's death and was prescribed sedatives to help her sleep. Of her father she wrote, "He was such a wonderful person, the very heart and centre of our happy family." She was consoled by her deeply held Christian beliefs, sometimes attending church twice daily. She resumed attending events with her family in April and returned to royal engagements and social appearances when official mourning ended in June. American newspapers noted her increasing vitality and speculated that she must be in love. With the widowed Queen Mother, Margaret moved out of Buckingham Palace and into Clarence House in May 1953, while the new queen and her family moved into Buckingham Palace. After George VI's death, Townsend was appointed Comptroller of the Queen Mother's household.

In June 1952, the estranged Townsends hosted Margaret, Elizabeth, and Philip, at a cocktail party at their home. A month later, Rosemary Townsend and her new partner John de László attended the Royal Windsor Horse Show. It is thought the romance between Margaret and Townsend began around this time. The first reports that they wished to marry appeared in August 1952, though such stories remained rare. The Townsends' divorce in November received little coverage in Britain but more detailed reporting abroad. After the divorce was finalised in December 1952, rumours about Townsend and Margaret spread more widely; the divorce, combined with their shared grief over the King's death, probably brought them closer within the privacy of Clarence House, where Margaret had her own apartment.

=== Marriage proposal ===
Private Secretary to the Queen Sir Alan Lascelles wrote that Townsend told him he had asked Margaret to marry him shortly before Christmas 1952. Other sources place the proposal in February or April 1953. He was 15 years her senior and had two children from his previous marriage. Margaret accepted and informed her sister, the Queen, whose consent was required under the Royal Marriages Act 1772. During the abdication crisis, the Church of England had refused to countenance the remarriage of the divorced. Queen Mary had recently died, and, after the coronation of Elizabeth II, the new queen planned to tour the Commonwealth for six months. She told her sister, "Under the circumstances, it isn't unreasonable for me to ask you to wait a year", and to keep the relationship secret until after the coronation.

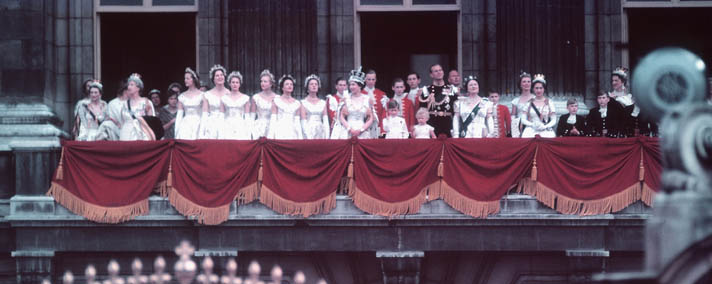
Following Elizabeth II's coronation, the royal family appeared on the balcony of Buckingham Palace on 2 June 1953. Margaret can be seen fourth from right, exactly next to the boys in black.

Although foreign media speculated on Margaret and Townsend's relationship, the British press did not. After reporters saw her plucking fluff from his coat during the coronation on 2 June 1953 – "I never thought a thing about it, and neither did Margaret", Townsend later said; "After that the storm broke" – The People first mentioned the relationship in Britain on 14 June. With the headline "They Must Deny it NOW", the front-page article warned that "scandalous rumours about Princess Margaret are racing around the world", which it insisted were "of course, utterly untrue". The foreign press believed that the Regency Act 1953 – which made Prince Philip regent instead of Margaret on the Queen's death – had been enacted to allow Margaret to marry Townsend, but as late as 23 July most British newspapers, except the Daily Mirror did not discuss the rumours. Acting Prime Minister Rab Butler asked that the "deplorable speculation" cease, without naming Margaret or Townsend.

The constitutional crisis caused by the proposed marriage was public. The Queen was advised by Lascelles to post Townsend abroad, but she refused and instead transferred him from the Queen Mother's household to her own, although he did not accompany Margaret as planned on a tour of Southern Rhodesia. Churchill personally approved of "a lovely young royal lady married to a gallant young airman", but Clementine Churchill reminded him that he had made the same mistake during the abdication crisis. The Cabinet refused to approve the marriage, and Geoffrey Fisher, Archbishop of Canterbury, did not support Margaret marrying a divorced man; opponents argued that the marriage would threaten the monarchy as Edward VIII's had. The Church of England Newspaper stated that Margaret "is a dutiful churchwoman who knows what strong views leaders of the church hold in this matter", while the Sunday Express – which had supported Edward and Wallis – asked, "IF THEY WANT TO MARRY, WHY SHOULDN'T THEY?".

Churchill discussed the matter at the 1953 Commonwealth Prime Ministers' Conference held alongside the coronation. Under the Statute of Westminster 1931, Dominion parliaments would also need to approve any Bill of Renunciation altering the line of succession. The Canadian government stated that altering the line twice in 25 years would harm the monarchy. Churchill informed the Queen that both his Cabinet and the Dominion prime ministers opposed the marriage, and that Parliament would not approve a union unrecognised by the Church of England unless Margaret renounced her rights to the throne.

Philip was reportedly the most opposed to Townsend within the royal family, while Margaret's mother and sister wanted her to be happy but could not approve the marriage. Besides Townsend's divorce, two major difficulties were financial and constitutional. Margaret did not possess her sister's large fortune and would need her £6,000 annual civil list allowance plus the additional £15,000 Parliament had provided for her upon a suitable marriage. She did not object to being removed from the line of succession, as the death of Elizabeth and all her children was unlikely, but parliamentary approval for the marriage would be difficult and uncertain. At 25, Margaret would no longer require the Queen's permission under the 1772 Act; after notifying the Privy Council, she could marry in one year unless Parliament intervened. Churchill told Elizabeth, however, that if one could easily leave the line of succession, another could easily enter it, which he considered dangerous for a hereditary monarchy.

Elizabeth told the couple to wait until 1955, when Margaret would be 25, avoiding the Queen having to publicly disapprove of her sister's marriage. Lascelles – who compared Townsend to Theudas "boasting himself to be somebody" – hoped that separating the pair would end the romance. Churchill arranged for Townsend's assignment as air attaché at the British Embassy in Brussels; he was sent on 15 July 1953, before Margaret's return from Rhodesia on 30 July. The assignment was so sudden that the British ambassador learnt of it from a newspaper. Although Margaret and Townsend knew of his new post, they had reportedly been promised a few days together before his departure.

=== Press coverage ===
For two years, press speculation continued. In Brussels, Townsend only said that "The word must come from somebody else". He avoided parties and being seen with women. With few duties (the sinecure was abolished after him), Townsend improved his French and horsemanship. He joined a Belgian show jumping club and rode in races around Europe. Margaret was told by the Church that she would be unable to receive communion if she married a divorced man. Three quarters of Sunday Express readers opposed the relationship, and Mass-Observation recorded criticism of the "silly little fool" as a poor example for young women who emulated her. Other newspaper polls showed popular support for Margaret's personal choice, regardless of Church teaching or government. Ninety-seven per cent of Daily Mirror readers supported marriage, and a Daily Express editorial stated that even if the Archbishop of Canterbury was displeased, "she would best please the vast majority of ordinary folk [by finding] happiness for herself".

The couple were not restricted on communicating by mail and telephone. Margaret worked with friends on charity productions of Lord and Lady Algy and The Frog, and publicly dated men such as Tennant and Wallace. In January 1955, she made the first of many trips to the Caribbean, perhaps to distract, and as a reward for being apart from Townsend. The attaché secretly travelled to Britain; while the palace was aware of one visit, he reportedly made other trips for nights and weekends with the princess at Clarence House – her apartment had its own front door – and friends' homes.

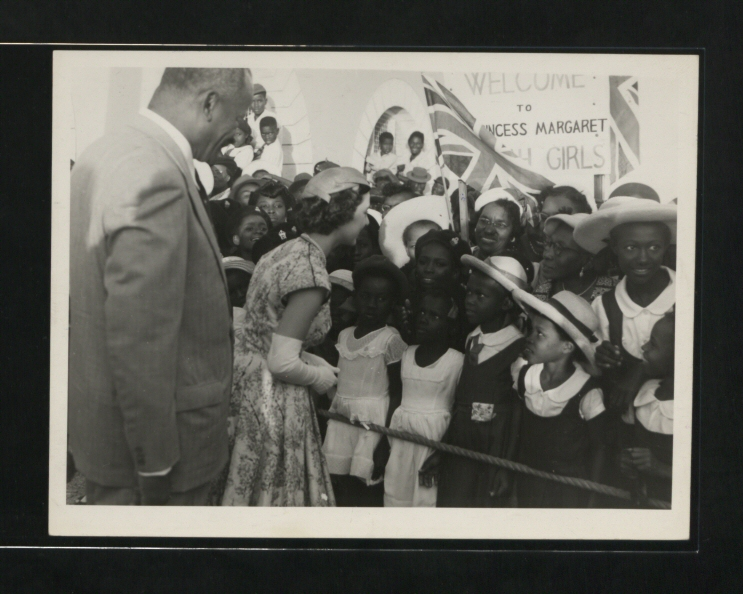
Margaret greeting schoolchildren at the opening of The Princess Margaret School in Barbados, 9 February 1955

That spring Townsend for the first time spoke to the press: "I am sick of being made to hide in my apartment like a thief", but whether he could marry "involves more people than myself". He reportedly believed that his exile from Margaret would soon end, their love was strong, and that the British people would support marrying. Townsend received a bodyguard and police guard around his apartment after the Belgian government received threats on his life, but the British government still said nothing; despite being perhaps the most famous man in the world in March 1955, Dan Ranfurly, Governor of the Bahamas, wondered at a press conference "Who is Peter Townsend?" Stating that people were more interested in the couple than the recent 1955 United Kingdom general election, on 29 May the Daily Express published an editorial demanding that Buckingham Palace confirm or deny the rumours.

The press described Margaret's 25th birthday, 21 August 1955, as the day she was free to marry, and expected an announcement about Townsend soon. Three hundred journalists waited outside Balmoral, four times as many as those later following Diana, Princess of Wales. "COME ON MARGARET!", the Daily Mirror's front page said two days earlier, asking her to "please make up your mind!". On 12 October Townsend returned from Brussels as Margaret's suitor. The royal family devised a system in which it did not host Townsend, but he and Margaret formally courted each other at dinner parties hosted by friends such as Mark Bonham Carter. A Gallup poll found that 59% of Britons approved of their marrying, with 17% opposed. Women in the East End of London shouted "Go on, Marg, do what you want" at the princess. Although the couple was never seen together in public during this time, the general consensus was that they would marry. Crowds waited outside Clarence House, and a global audience read daily updates and rumours on newspaper front pages.

"Nothing much else than Princess Margaret's affairs is being talked of in this country", The Manchester Guardian said on 15 October. "NOW – THE NATION WAITS" was a typical headline. Observers interpreted Buckingham Palace's request to the press to respect Margaret's privacy – the first time the palace discussed the princess's recent personal life – as evidence of an imminent betrothal announcement, probably before the Opening of Parliament on 25 October. As no announcement occurred – the Daily Mirror on 17 October showed a photograph of Margaret's left hand with the headline "NO RING YET!" – the press wondered why. Parliamentarians "are frankly puzzled by the way the affair has been handled", the News Chronicle wrote. "If a marriage is on, they ask, why not announce it quickly? If there is to be no marriage, why allow the couple to continue to meet without a clear denial of the rumours?"

Why a betrothal did not occur is unclear. Margaret may have been uncertain of her desire, having written to Prime Minister Anthony Eden in August that "It is only by seeing him in this way that I feel I can properly decide whether I can marry him or not". Margaret's authorized biographer Christopher Warwick said that the letter was evidence that her love for Townsend was not as strong as the public believed, and that she wanted only the prime minister and Elizabeth to know of her uncertainty. Margaret may have told Townsend as early as 12 October that governmental and familial opposition to their marriage had not changed; it is possible that neither they nor Elizabeth fully understood until that year how difficult the 1772 Act made a royal marriage without the monarch's permission. An influential 26 October editorial in The Times stating that "The QUEEN's sister married to a divorced man (even though the innocent party) would be irrevocably disqualified from playing her part in the essential royal function" represented The Establishment's view of what it considered a possibly dangerous crisis. It convinced many, who had believed that the media were exaggerating, that Margaret really might defy the Church and royal standards. Leslie Weatherhead, President of the Methodist Conference, now criticized the proposed marriage.

Townsend recalled that "we felt mute and numbed at the centre of this maelstrom"; Elizabeth also wanted the media circus to end. Townsend only had his RAF income and, other than a talent for writing, had no experience in other work. He wrote in his autobiography that Margaret "could have married me only if she had been prepared to give up everything – her position, her prestige, her privy purse. I simply hadn't the weight, I knew it, to counterbalance all she would have lost" for what Kenneth Rose described as "life in a cottage on a Group Captain's salary". Royal historian Hugo Vickers wrote that "Lascelles's separation plan had worked and the love between them had died". Warwick said that "having spent two years apart, they were no longer as in love as they had been. Townsend was not the love of her life – the love of her life was her father, King George VI, whom she adored".

More than 100 journalists waited at Balmoral when Eden arrived to discuss the marriage with Elizabeth and Margaret on 1 October 1955. Lord Kilmuir, the Lord Chancellor, that month prepared a secret government document on the proposed marriage. According to a 1958 biography of Townsend by Norman Barrymaine and other accounts, Eden said that his government would oppose in Parliament Margaret retaining her royal status. Parliament might pass resolutions opposing the marriage, which the people would see as a disagreement between government and monarchy; Lord Salisbury, a High Anglican, might resign from the government rather than help pass a Bill of Renunciation. While the government could not prevent the marriage when Margaret became a private individual after a Bill of Renunciation, she would no longer be a Counsellor of State and would lose her civil list allowance; otherwise, taxpayers would subsidise a divorced man and his sons. The Church would consider any children from the marriage to be illegitimate. Eden recommended that, like her uncle Edward and his wife Wallis, Margaret and Townsend leave Britain for several years.

Papers released in 2004 to the National Archives disagree. They show that Elizabeth and Eden (who had been divorced and remarried himself) planned to amend the 1772 Act. Margaret would have been able to marry Townsend by removing her and any children from the marriage from the line of succession, and thus the Queen's permission would no longer be necessary. Margaret would be allowed to keep her royal title and her allowance, stay in the country, and even continue with her public duties. Eden described Elizabeth's attitude in a letter on the subject to the Commonwealth prime ministers as "Her Majesty would not wish to stand in the way of her sister's happiness". Eden himself was sympathetic; "Exclusion from the Succession would not entail any other change in Princess Margaret's position as a member of the Royal Family", he wrote.

According to the final draft of the plan, Margaret would announce on 28 October 1955 that she would marry Townsend and leave the line of succession. As prearranged by Eden, the Queen would consult with the British and Commonwealth governments, and then ask them to amend the 1772 Act. Eden would have told Parliament that the Act was "out of harmony with modern conditions". Kilmuir had advised Eden that the 1772 Act was flawed and might not apply to Margaret anyway. Kilmuir estimated that 75% of Britons would approve of allowing the marriage. The August letter to Eden is evidence, Warwick said, that Margaret was aware of the government's intention to preserve her title and allowance.

The decision not to marry was made on the 24th and for the following week, Margaret worked on the wording of her statement, which was released on the 31st. It is unclear what or when she was told about the government proposal, drafted on the 28th. By the early 1980s she was still protesting to biographers that the couple had been given false hope marriage was possible and she would have ended the relationship sooner had she been informed otherwise.

The Daily Mirror on 28 October discussed The Times's editorial with the headline "THIS CRUEL PLAN MUST BE EXPOSED". Although Margaret and Townsend had read the editorial the newspaper denounced as from "a dusty world and a forgotten age", they had earlier made their decision and written an announcement.

=== End of relationship ===
On 31 October 1955, Margaret issued a statement:

I would like it to be known that I have decided not to marry Group Captain Peter Townsend. I have been aware that, subject to my renouncing my rights of succession, it might have been possible for me to contract a civil marriage. But mindful of the Church's teachings that Christian marriage is indissoluble, and conscious of my duty to the Commonwealth, I have resolved to put these considerations before others. I have reached this decision entirely alone, and in doing so I have been strengthened by the unfailing support and devotion of Group Captain Townsend.

"Thoroughly drained, thoroughly demoralized", Margaret later said, she and Townsend wrote the statement together. She refused when Oliver Dawnay, the Queen Mother's private secretary, asked to remove the word "devotion". The written statement, signed "Margaret", was the first official confirmation of the relationship. Some Britons were disbelieving or angry while others, including clergy, were proud of Margaret for choosing duty and faith; newspapers were evenly divided on the decision. Mass-Observation recorded indifference or criticism of the couple among men, but great interest among women, whether for or against. Kenneth Tynan, John Minton, Ronald Searle, and others signed an open letter from "the younger generation". Published in the Daily Express on 4 November, the letter said that the end of the relationship had exposed The Establishment and "our national hypocrisy".

Townsend recalled that "We had reached the end of the road, our feelings for one another were unchanged, but they had incurred for us a burden so great that we decided together to lay it down". The Associated Press said that Margaret's statement was almost "a rededication of her life to the duties of royalty, making unlikely any marriage for her in the near future"; the princess may have expected never to marry after the long relationship ended, because most of her eligible male friends were no longer bachelors. Barrymaine agreed that Margaret intended the statement to mean that she would never marry, but wrote that Townsend probably did not accept any such vow to him by the princess, and his subsequent departure from Britain for two years was to refrain from interfering with her life. "We both had a feeling of unimaginable relief. We were liberated at last from this monstrous problem", Townsend said.

After resigning from the RAF and travelling around the world for 18 months Townsend returned in March 1958; he and Margaret met several times, but could not avoid the press ("TOGETHER AGAIN") or royal disapproval. Townsend again left Britain to write a book about his trip; Barrymaine concluded in 1958 that "none of the fundamental obstacles to their marriage has been overcome – or shows any prospects of being overcome". Townsend said during a 1970 book tour that he and Margaret did not correspond and they had not seen each other since a "friendly" 1958 meeting, "just like I think a lot of people never see their old girl friends". Their love letters are in the Royal Archives and will not be available to the public until 100 years after Margaret's birth, August 2030. These are unlikely to include Margaret's letters. In 1959, she wrote to Townsend in response to him informing her of his remarriage plans, accusing him of betraying their vow not to marry anyone else and requesting her love letters to him be destroyed. He claimed he complied with her wishes, but kept this letter and an envelope of burned shards of the vow she had sent, eventually destroying these also. He was apparently unaware Margaret had already broken the pact by her engagement to Billy Wallace as it was not revealed until many years later.

In October 1993, a friend of Margaret revealed she had met Townsend for what turned out to be the last time before his death in 1995. She had not wanted to attend the 1992 reunion to which they had both been invited, for fear it might be picked up by the press, so she asked to see him privately instead. Margaret said that he looked "exactly the same, except he had grey hair". Guests said he had not really changed, and that they just sat chatting like old friends. They also found him disgruntled and had convinced himself that in agreeing to part, he and Margaret had set a noble example which seemed to have been in vain.

Billy Wallace later said that "The thing with Townsend was a girlish nonsense that got out of hand. It was never the big thing on her part that people claim".

== Marriage to Antony Armstrong-Jones ==
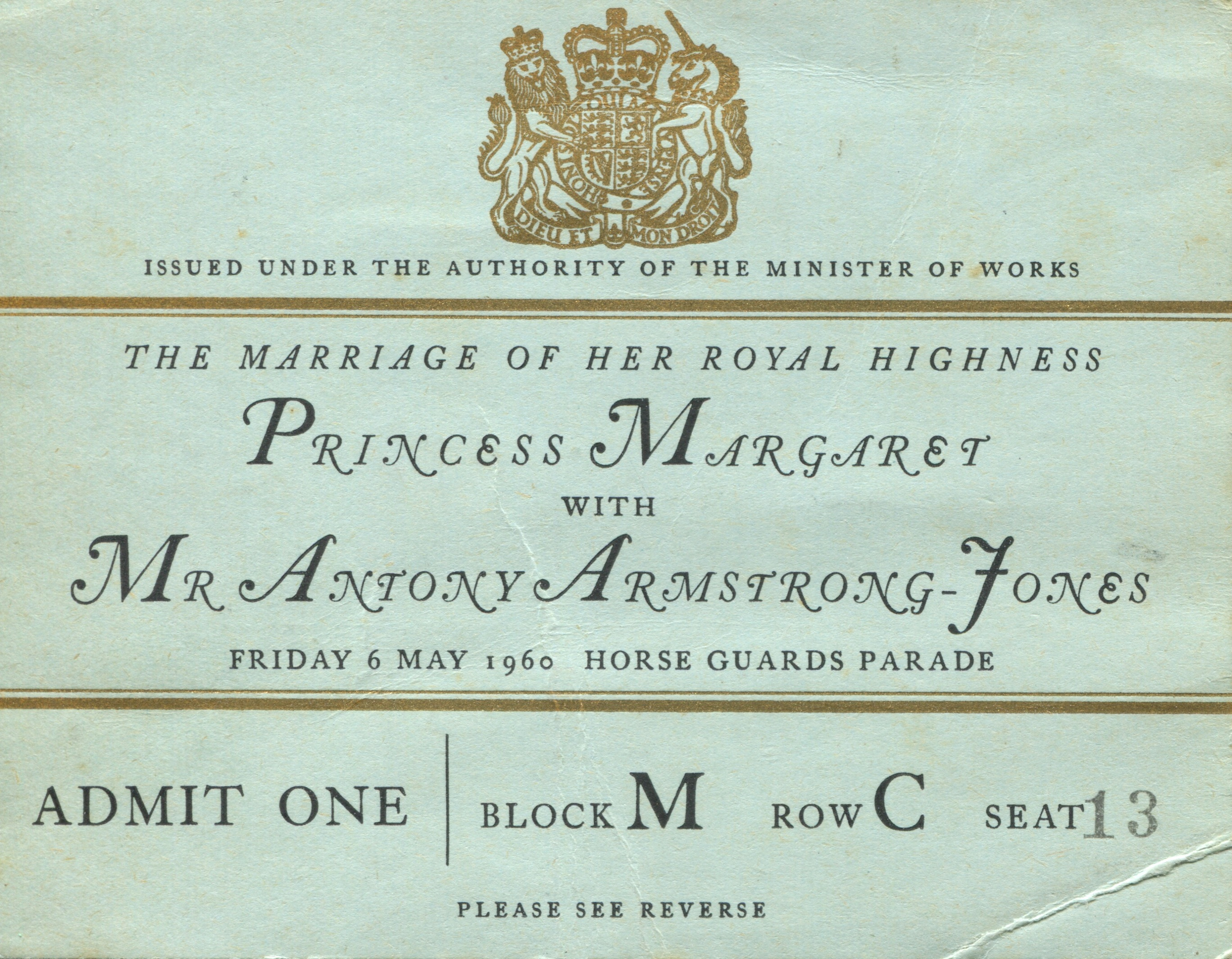
A ticket for the wedding procession

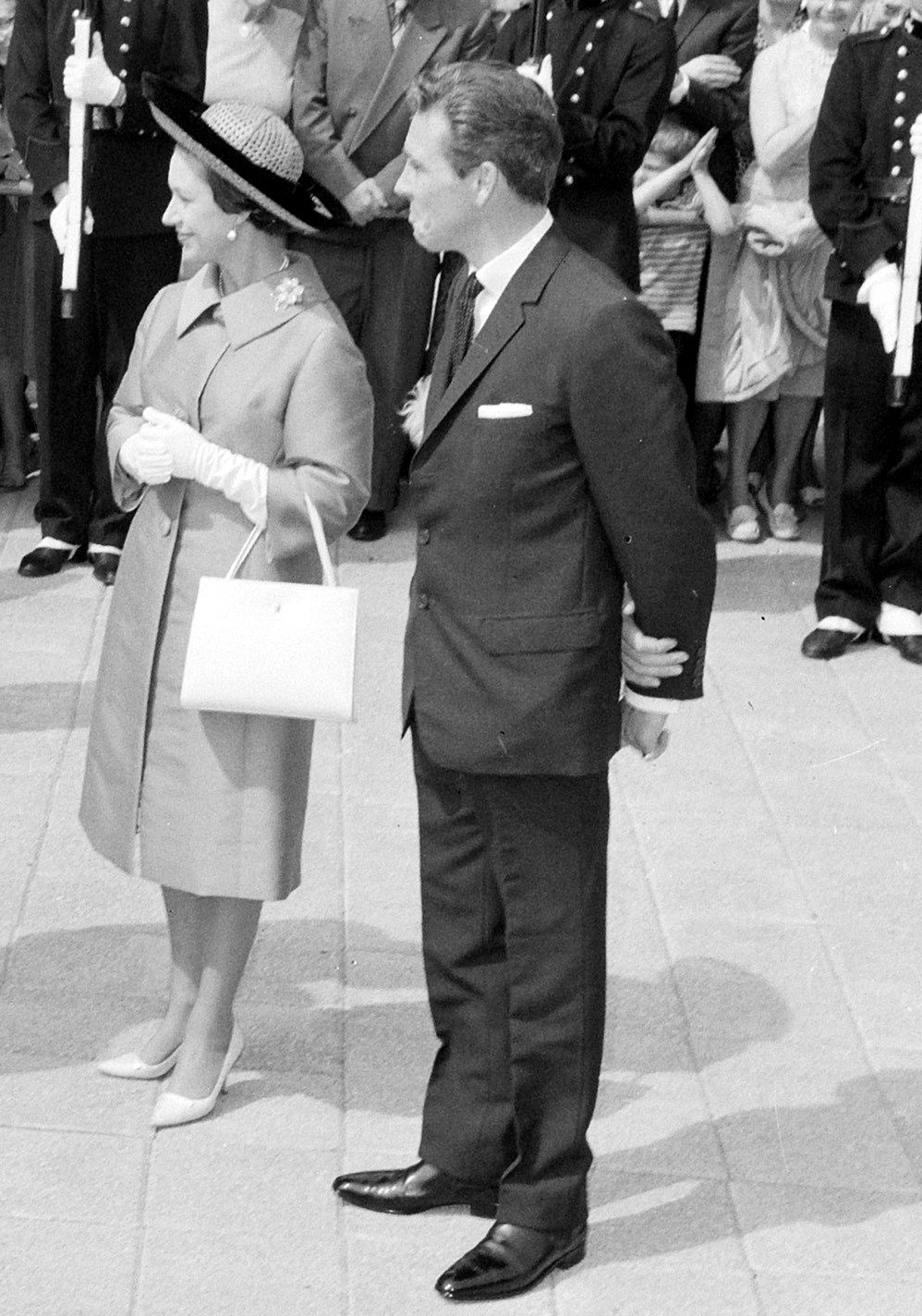
Margaret with her husband Lord Snowdon, May 1965

Margaret accepted one of Wallace's many proposals to marry in 1956, but the engagement ended before an official announcement when he admitted to a romance in the Bahamas; "I had my chance and blew it with my big mouth", Wallace said. Margaret did not reveal this publicly until an interview and subsequent biography with Nigel Dempster in 1977.

Margaret met the photographer Antony Armstrong-Jones at a supper party in 1958. They became engaged in October 1959. Armstrong-Jones proposed to Margaret with a ruby engagement ring surrounded by diamonds in the shape of a rosebud. She reportedly accepted his proposal a day after learning from Townsend that he intended to marry a young Belgian woman, Marie-Luce Jamagne, who was half his age and greatly resembled Margaret. Margaret's announcement of her engagement, on 26 February 1960, surprised the press, as she had concealed the romance from reporters.

Margaret married Armstrong-Jones at Westminster Abbey on 6 May 1960. The ceremony was the first royal wedding to be broadcast on television, and it attracted viewing figures of 300 million worldwide. 2,000 guests were invited for the wedding ceremony. Margaret's wedding dress was designed by Norman Hartnell and worn with the Poltimore Tiara. She had eight young bridesmaids, led by her niece, Anne. The Duke of Edinburgh escorted the bride, and the best man was Roger Gilliatt. Archbishop of Canterbury Geoffrey Fisher conducted the marriage service. Following the ceremony, the couple made the traditional appearance on the balcony of Buckingham Palace. The honeymoon was a six-week West Indies cruise aboard the royal yacht Britannia. As a wedding present, 3rd Baron Glenconner, Colin Tennant gave her a plot of land on his private Caribbean island, Mustique. The newlyweds moved into rooms in Kensington Palace.

In 1961, Margaret's husband was created Earl of Snowdon. The couple had two children (both born by Caesarean section at Margaret's request): David, born 3 November 1961, and Sarah, born 1 May 1964. The marriage widened Margaret's social circle beyond the court and aristocracy to include show business celebrities and bohemians. At the time, it was thought to reflect the breaking down of British class barriers. The Snowdons experimented with the styles and fashions of the 1960s.

=== Separation and divorce ===
Both parties in the marriage regularly engaged in extramarital relationships. Lord Snowdon had a series of affairs, including with long-term mistress, Ann Hills, and Lady Jacqueline Rufus-Isaacs, daughter of the 3rd Marquess of Reading. Anne de Courcy's 2008 biography summarises the situation with a quote from a close friend: "If it moves, he'll have it."

Reportedly, Margaret had her first extramarital affair in 1966, with her daughter's godfather Anthony Barton, a Bordeaux wine producer. A year later she had a one-month liaison with Robin Douglas-Home, a nephew of former British prime minister Alec Douglas-Home. Margaret claimed that her relationship with Douglas-Home was platonic, but her letters to him (which were later sold) were intimate. Douglas-Home, who suffered from depression, died by suicide 18 months after the split with Margaret. Claims that she was romantically involved with musician Mick Jagger, actor Peter Sellers, and Australian cricketer Keith Miller are unproven. According to biographer Charlotte Breese, entertainer Leslie Hutchinson had a "brief liaison" with Margaret in 1955. A 2009 biography of actor David Niven included assertions, based on information from Niven's widow and a good friend of Niven's, that he had had an affair with Margaret, who was 20 years his junior. In 1975, Margaret was listed among women with whom actor Warren Beatty had had romantic relationships. John Bindon, an actor from Fulham, who had spent time in prison, sold his story to the Daily Mirror, boasting of a close relationship with Margaret.

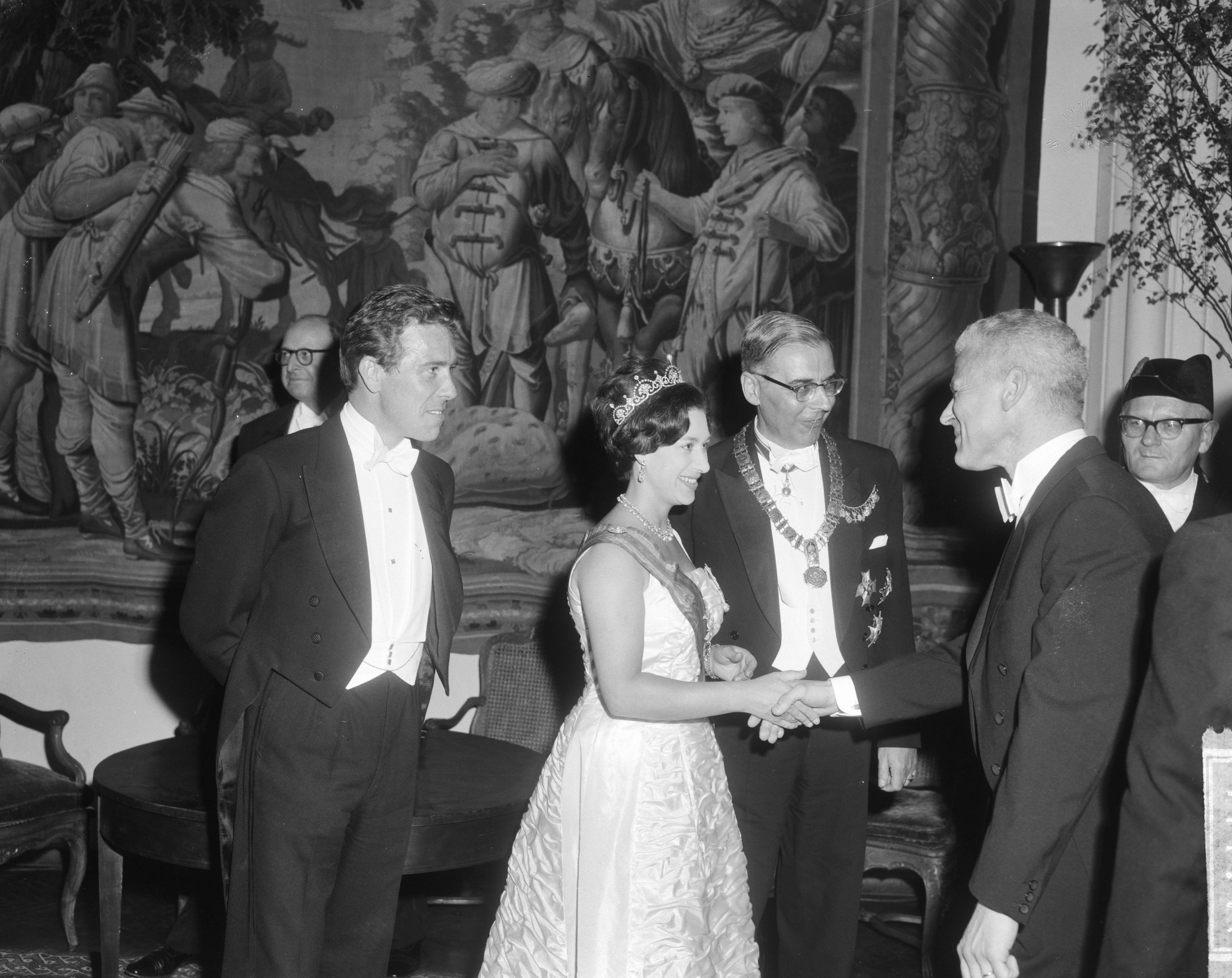
Margaret shakes hands with Mayor of Amsterdam Gijs van Hall, 14 May 1965

Beyond extramarital relationships, the marriage was accompanied by drugs, alcohol, and bizarre behaviour by both parties, such as Snowdon's leaving lists of "things I hate about you" for Margaret to find between the pages of books she read. According to biographer Sarah Bradford, one note read: "You look like a Jewish manicurist and I hate you".

By the early 1970s, the couple had drifted apart. In September 1973, Colin Tennant introduced Margaret to Roddy Llewellyn. Llewellyn was 17 years her junior. In 1974, she invited him as a guest to Les Jolies Eaux, the holiday home she had built on Mustique. It was the first of several visits. Margaret described their relationship as "a loving friendship". Once, when Llewellyn left on an impulsive trip to Turkey, Margaret became emotionally distraught and took an overdose of sleeping tablets. "I was so exhausted because of everything", she later said, "that all I wanted to do was sleep". As she recovered, her ladies-in-waiting kept Snowdon away from her, afraid that seeing him would distress her further.

In February 1976, a picture of Margaret and Llewellyn in swimsuits on Mustique was published on the front page of a tabloid, the News of the World. The press portrayed Margaret as a predatory older woman and Llewellyn as her toyboy lover. On 19 March 1976, Margaret and Snowdon publicly acknowledged that their marriage had irretrievably broken down and that they had decided to separate. Some politicians suggested removing Margaret from the civil list. Labour MPs denounced her as "a royal parasite" and a "floosie". On 24 May 1978, the decree nisi for the couple's divorce was granted. In the same month, Margaret was taken ill, and diagnosed as suffering from gastroenteritis and alcoholic hepatitis, although Christopher Warwick in his biography, Princess Margaret: A Life of Contrasts (2002), denied that she was ever an alcoholic. On 11 July 1978, the divorce was finalised. It was the first divorce of a senior member of the British royal family since that of Princess Victoria Melita of Edinburgh and Ernest Louis, Grand Duke of Hesse in 1901. Allegedly, Margaret did not want a divorce: she tried to make her marriage succeed, but there were "too many challenges". Devastated by the divorce, Margaret never remarried. On 15 December 1978, Snowdon married Lucy Lindsay-Hogg, but he and Margaret remained close friends.

In 1981, Llewellyn married Tatiana Soskin, whom he had known for 10 years. Margaret remained close friends with them both.

== Public life ==
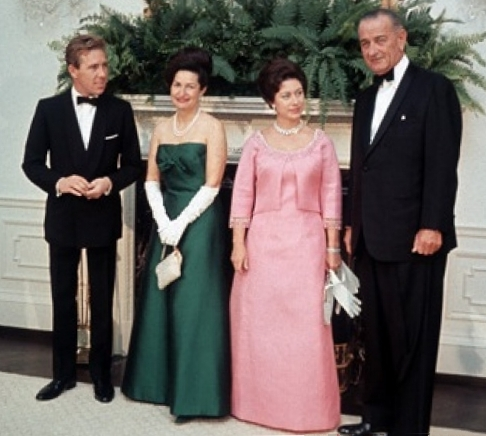
Margaret and Snowdon with Lyndon B. and Lady Bird Johnson at the White House, 17 November 1965

According to Margaret, her first solo public engagement was presenting a prize at the Princess Margaret Rose School in Windsor when she was 12. Among her first official engagements was launching the ocean liner Edinburgh Castle in Belfast in 1947. Subsequently, Margaret went on multiple tours of various places; in her first major tour she joined her parents and sister for a tour of South Africa in 1947. Her tour aboard Britannia to the British colonies in the Caribbean in 1955 created a sensation throughout the West Indies, and calypsos were dedicated to her. As colonies of the British Commonwealth of Nations sought nationhood, Margaret represented the Crown at independence ceremonies in Jamaica in 1962 and Tuvalu and Dominica in 1978. Her visit to Tuvalu was cut short by an illness, which may have been viral pneumonia, and she was flown to Australia to recuperate. Other overseas tours included East Africa and Mauritius in 1956, the United States in 1965, Japan in 1969 and 1979, the United States and Canada in 1974, Australia in 1975, the Philippines in 1980, Swaziland in 1981, and China in 1987.

In August 1979, Margaret's second cousin once-removed Lord Mountbatten and members of his family were killed by a bomb planted by the Provisional Irish Republican Army. That October, while on a fundraising tour of the United States on behalf of the Royal Opera House, Margaret was seated at a dinner reception in Chicago with columnist Abra Anderson and Mayor Jane Byrne. Margaret told them that the royal family had been moved by the many letters of condolence from Ireland. The following day, Anderson's rival Irv Kupcinet published a claim that Margaret had referred to the Irish as "pigs". Margaret, Anderson, and Byrne all issued immediate denials, but the damage was already done. The rest of the tour drew demonstrations, and Margaret's security was doubled in the face of physical threats.

=== Charity work ===
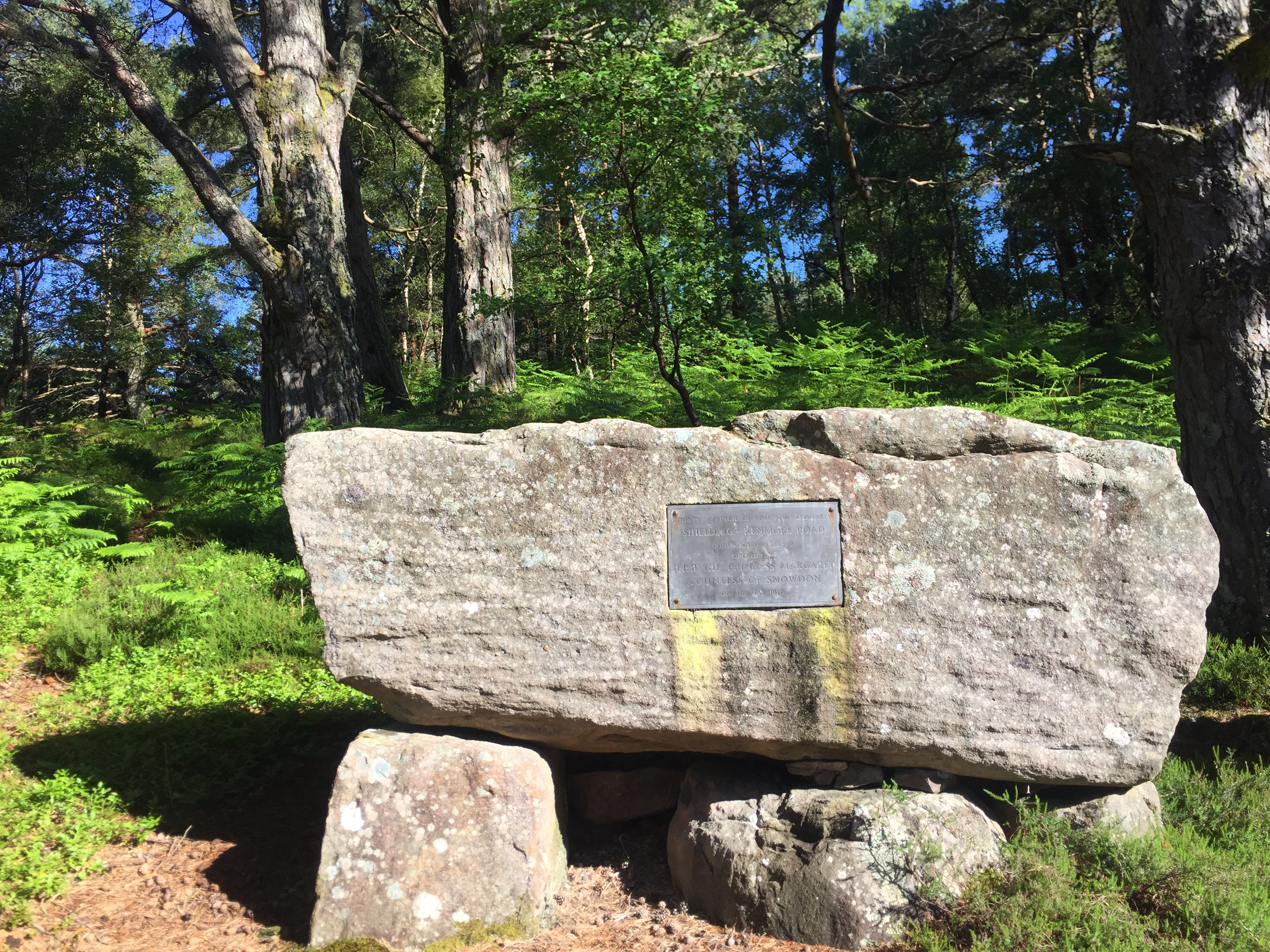
Sheildag-Kenmore Road in the Scottish Highlands opened by Princess Margaret on 11 May 1970

Margaret's main interests were welfare charities, music and ballet. She was president of the National Society for the Prevention of Cruelty to Children (NSPCC), the Royal Scottish Society for the Prevention of Cruelty to Children (Children 1st), and Invalid Children's Aid Nationwide (also called 'I CAN'). She was also Grand President of the St John Ambulance Brigade. Margaret was president or patron of numerous organisations, such as the West Indies Olympic Association, the Girl Guides, Northern Ballet Theatre, Birmingham Royal Ballet, Scottish Ballet, Tenovus Cancer Care, the Royal College of Nursing, and the London Lighthouse (an AIDS charity that has since merged with the Terrence Higgins Trust). In her capacity as president of the Royal Ballet, she played a key role in launching a fund for Dame Margot Fonteyn, who was experiencing financial troubles. With the help of the Children's Royal Variety Performance, she also organised yearly fundraisers for NSPCC. At some points Margaret was criticised for not being as active as other members of the royal family.

== Illness and death ==
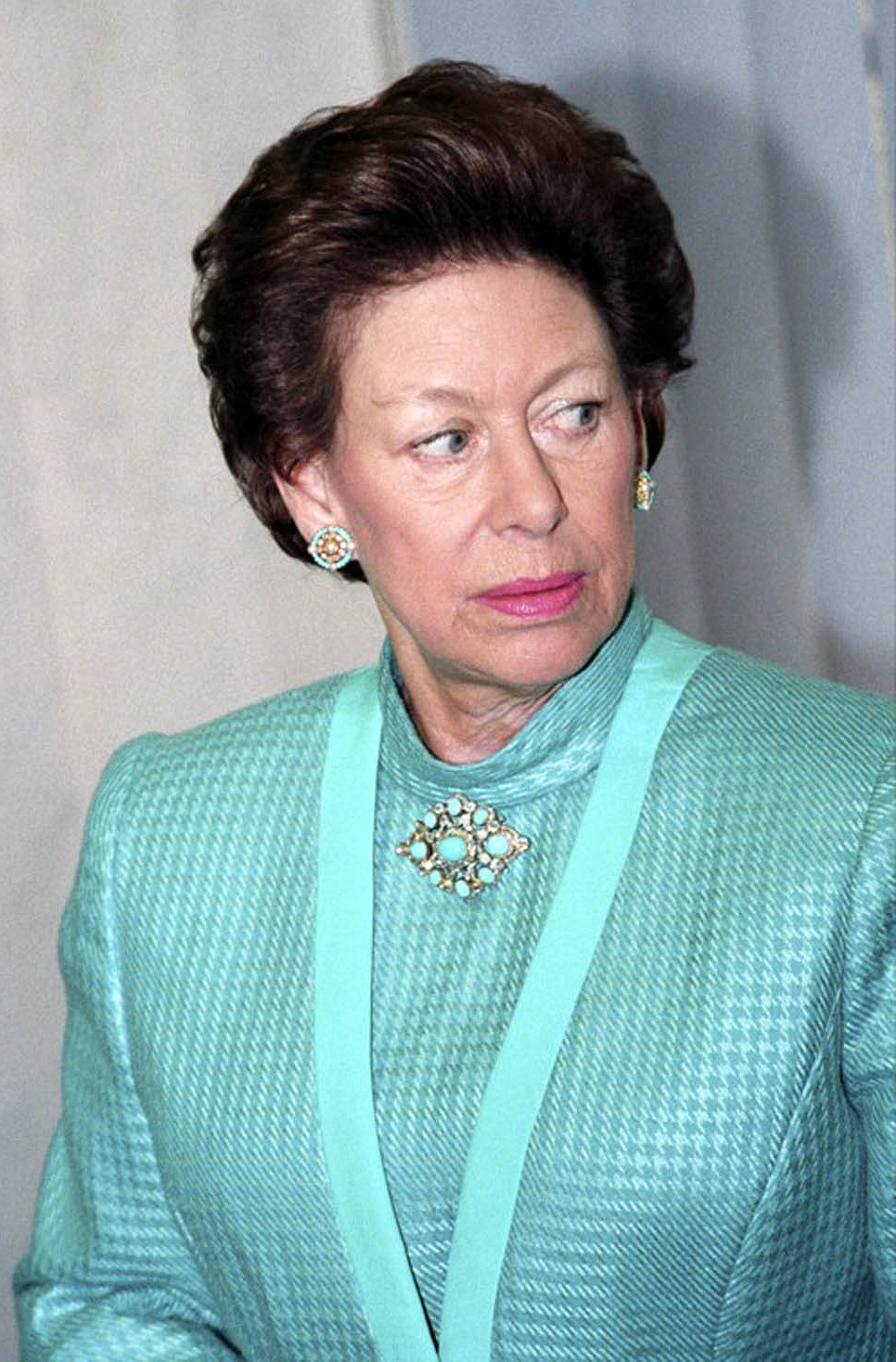
Margaret in later life

Margaret's later life was marred by illness and disability. She began smoking cigarettes in her late teens and continued to smoke heavily for many years thereafter. In the 1970s, she suffered a nervous breakdown and was treated for depression by a psychiatrist from the Priory Clinic. She later suffered from migraines, laryngitis, and bronchitis. In January 1980, she was operated on at the London Clinic to remove a benign skin lesion. On 5 January 1985, she had part of her left lung removed; the operation drew parallels with that of her father 34 years earlier. She quit smoking in 1991 or January 1993, although servants still claimed they could smell cigarette smoke in her apartment, and she continued to drink heavily.

In January 1993, Margaret was admitted to hospital for pneumonia. She experienced a mild stroke on 23 February 1998 at her holiday home in Mustique. Early the following year, she suffered severe scalds to her feet in a bathroom accident, which affected her mobility in that she required support when walking and sometimes used a wheelchair. She was hospitalised on 10 January 2001 due to loss of appetite and swallowing problems after a further stroke. By March 2001, strokes had left her with partial vision and paralysis on the left side. Margaret's last public appearances were at the 101st birthday celebrations of her mother in August 2001 and the 100th birthday celebration of her aunt Princess Alice, Duchess of Gloucester, that December.

Margaret died in her sleep at King Edward VII's Hospital at 6:30 am on 9 February 2002, aged 71, three days after the 50th anniversary of her father's death. She was 11th in line to the throne at the time of her death. The previous day, she had suffered another stroke that was followed by cardiac problems. Charles paid tribute to his aunt in a television broadcast. UK politicians and foreign leaders sent their condolences as well. Following her death, private memorial services were held at St Mary Magdalene Church and Glamis Castle.

Margaret's coffin, draped in her personal standard, was taken from Kensington Palace to St James's Palace before her funeral. Her funeral was held on 15 February, the 50th anniversary of her father's funeral. In line with her wishes, the ceremony was a private service at St George's Chapel, Windsor Castle, for family and friends. Unlike most other members of the royal family, she was cremated at Slough Crematorium. Her lady-in-waiting, Lady Glenconner, stated that Margaret found the Royal Burial Ground at Frogmore "very gloomy" and would have wanted to be where her father was buried.

Margaret's ashes were temporarily placed in the Royal Vault of St George's Chapel. Following the Queen Mother's death seven weeks later, and after her funeral, they were interred in the King George VI Memorial Chapel to rest alongside her parents. A service of thanksgiving and remembrance for Margaret was held at Westminster Abbey on 19 April 2002. A memorial service marking the 10th anniversary of the deaths of both Margaret and the Queen Mother was held on 30 March 2012 at St George's Chapel, Windsor Castle, attended by Queen Elizabeth II and other members of the royal family.

== Legacy ==
=== Image ===
We thank thee Lord who by thy spirit doth our faith restore
When we with worldly things commune & prayerless close our door
We lose our precious gift divine to worship and adore
Then thou our Saviour, fill our hearts to love thee evermore

— Princess Margaret's epitaph, which she wrote herself, is carved on a memorial stone in St George's Chapel, Windsor Castle

Observers often characterised Margaret as a spoiled snob capable of cutting remarks and hauteur. Critics claimed that she even looked down on her grandmother Queen Mary because Mary was born a princess with the lower "Serene Highness" style, whereas Margaret was a "Royal Highness" by birth. Their letters, however, provide no indication of friction between them.

Margaret could also be charming and informal. People who came into contact with her could be perplexed by her swings between frivolity and formality. Marion Crawford wrote in her memoir: "Impulsive and bright remarks she made became headlines and, taken out of their context, began to produce in the public eye an oddly distorted personality that bore little resemblance to the Margaret we knew."

Margaret's acquaintance Gore Vidal, the American writer, wrote: "She was far too intelligent for her station in life". He recalled a conversation with Margaret in which, discussing her public notoriety, she said: "It was inevitable, when there are two sisters and one is the Queen, who must be the source of honour and all that is good, while the other must be the focus of the most creative malice, the evil sister".

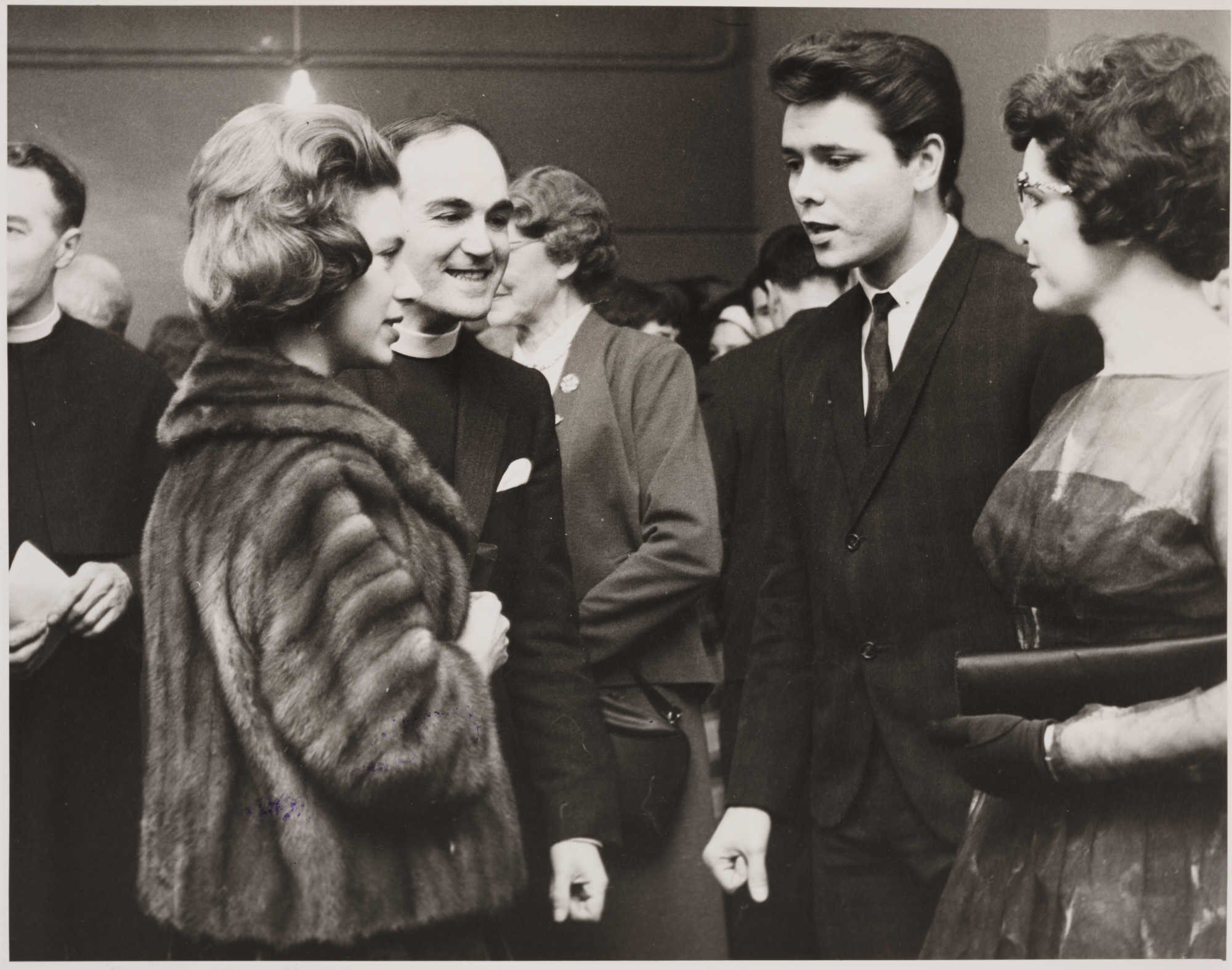
Margaret (left) and Cliff Richard at the 59 Club, London in 1962

As a child, Margaret enjoyed pony shows, but unlike other family members she did not express interest in hunting, shooting, and fishing in adulthood. She became interested in ballet from a very young age and enjoyed participating in amateur plays. She directed one such play, titled The Frogs, with her aristocratic friends as cast members. Actors and film stars were among the regular visitors to her residence at Kensington Palace. In January 1981, she was the guest for an episode of BBC Radio 4's Desert Island Discs. Her musical choices included "Sixteen Tons" by Tennessee Ernie Ford which she said had entertained her in a traffic jam. Her favourite was Pyotr Ilyich Tchaikovsky's Swan Lake. In 1984, she appeared as herself in an episode of the radio drama The Archers, becoming the first member of the royal family to take part in a BBC drama.

Margaret's private life was for many years the subject of intense speculation by media and royalty watchers. Her house on Mustique, designed by her husband's uncle Oliver Messel, a stage designer, was her favourite holiday destination. Allegations of wild parties and drug taking also surfaced in the media.

Margaret was a devout Anglican her whole life, though "she had desires that often conflicted with her faith". At one point, she considered becoming Roman Catholic.

Following Margaret's death, her lady-in-waiting, Lady Glenconner, said that "[Margaret] was devoted to the Queen and tremendously supportive of her". Margaret was described by her cousin Lady Elizabeth Shakerley as "somebody who had a wonderful capacity for giving a lot of people pleasure and she was making a very, very, very good and loyal friend". Another cousin, Lord Lichfield, said that "[Margaret] was pretty sad towards the end of her life because it was a life unfulfilled".

The Independent wrote in Townsend's 1995 obituary that "The immense display of popular sentiment and interest [in the relationship] can now be seen to have constituted a watershed in the nation's attitude towards divorce". The Archbishop of Canterbury and the Church received much of the popular anger toward the end of the relationship. Randolph Churchill believed that rumours "that Fisher had intervened to prevent the Princess from marrying Townsend has done incalculable harm to the Church of England"; a Gallup poll found that 28% agreed, and 59% disagreed, with the Church's refusal to remarry a divorced person while the other spouse was alive. Biographer Warwick suggests that Margaret's most enduring legacy is an accidental one. Perhaps unwittingly, Margaret paved the way for public acceptance of royal divorce. Her life, if not her actions, made the decisions and choices of her sister's children, three of whom divorced, easier than they otherwise would have been.

Eden reportedly told Elizabeth in Balmoral when discussing Margaret and Townsend that, regardless of outcome, the monarchy would be damaged. In 1995, Harold Brooks-Baker was quoted in Townsend's obituary: "In my opinion, this was the turning point to disaster for the royal family. After Princess Margaret was denied marriage, it backfired and more or less ruined Margaret's life. The Queen decided that from then on, anyone someone in her family wanted to marry would be more or less acceptable. The royal family and the public now feel that they've gone too far in the other direction".

=== Fashion and style ===
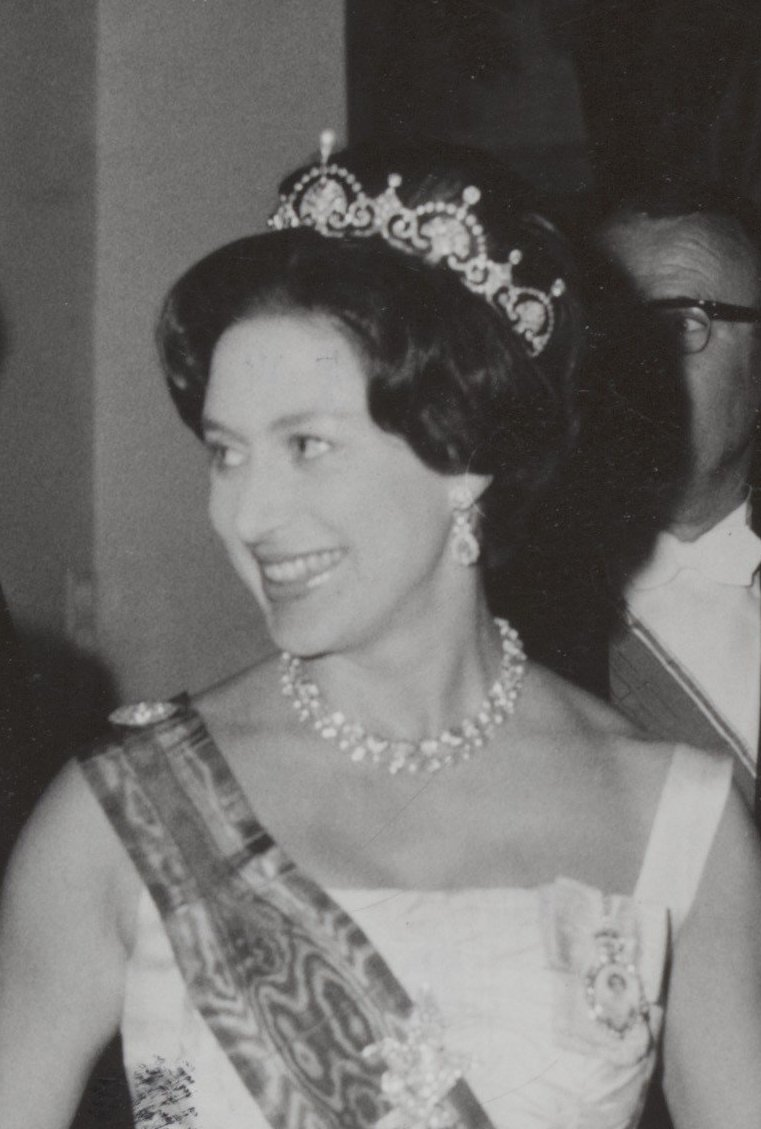
Margaret in 1965

During her lifetime, Margaret was considered a fashion icon. Her fashion earned the nickname 'The Margaret Look'. Margaret, dubbed a 'royal rebel', styled herself in contrast to her sister's prim and timeless style, adopting trendy mod accessories, such as brightly coloured headscarves and glamorous sunglasses. Margaret developed a close relationship with fashion designer Christian Dior, wearing his designs throughout her life and becoming one of his most prominent customers. In 1950, he designed a cream gown worn for her 21st birthday, which has been cited as an iconic part of fashion history. Throughout the decade, Margaret was known for wearing floral-print dresses, bold-hued ballgowns and luxurious fabrics, accessorising with diamonds, pearls, and fur stoles. British Vogue wrote that Margaret's style 'hit her stride' in the mid-60s, where she was photographed alongside celebrities like The Beatles, Frank Sinatra and Sophia Loren. Margaret was also known for her "magnificent" hats and headdresses, including a canary feather hat worn on a 1962 Jamaica visit and a peacock feather pillbox hat to the 1973 Royal Ascot. Marie Claire stated that the princess "refused to compromise" on her style later in life, continuing with trends of big sleeves and strapless evening gowns.

In April 2007, an exhibition titled Princess Line – The Fashion Legacy of Princess Margaret opened at Kensington Palace, showcasing contemporary fashion from British designers such as Vivienne Westwood inspired by Margaret's legacy of style. Christopher Bailey's Spring 2006 collection for Burberry was inspired by Margaret's look from the 1960s.

=== Finances ===
In her lifetime, Margaret's fortune was estimated to be around £20 million, with most of it being inherited from her father. She also inherited pieces of art and antiques from Queen Mary, and Dame Margaret Greville left her £20,000 in 1943. In 1999, her son, Lord Linley, sold his mother's Caribbean residence Les Jolies Eaux for a reported £2.4 million. At the time of her death Margaret received £219,000 from the civil list. Following her death, she left a £7.6 million estate to her two children, which was cut down to £4.5 million after inheritance tax. In June 2006, much of Margaret's estate was auctioned by Christie's to meet the tax and, in her son's words, "normal family requirements such as educating her grandchildren", though some of the items were sold in aid of charities such as the Stroke Association. Reportedly, Elizabeth had made it clear that the proceeds from any item that was given to her sister in an official capacity must be donated to charities. A world record price of £1.24 million was set by a Fabergé clock. The Poltimore Tiara, which she wore for her wedding in 1960, sold for £926,400. A portrait of Margaret by Pietro Annigoni was purchased back by her son at the price of £680,000–more than three times the original estimate–once it became apparent that the sale had far exceeded expectations. The sale of her effects totalled £13,658,000.

=== In popular culture ===
Actresses who have portrayed Margaret include Lucy Cohu (The Queen's Sister, 2005), Katie McGrath (The Queen, 2009), Ramona Marquez (The King's Speech, 2010), Bel Powley (A Royal Night Out, 2015), Olivia Benjamin (Father Brown, 2023), and Vanessa Kirby, Helena Bonham Carter, and Lesley Manville, who all played different stages of Margaret's life during The Crown, 2016–2023. The young Margaret was played by Beau Gadsdon. The 2008 heist film, The Bank Job, revolves around alleged photos of Margaret. A character, "Pantomime Princess Margaret", made regular appearances in the BBC's 1970s comedy show Monty Python's Flying Circus.

== Titles, styles, honours and arms ==
Royal monogram

=== Titles and styles ===
- 21 August 1930 – 11 December 1936: Her Royal Highness Princess Margaret of York
- 11 December 1936 – 6 October 1961: Her Royal Highness The Princess Margaret
- 6 October 1961 – 9 February 2002: Her Royal Highness The Princess Margaret, Countess of Snowdon

=== Honours ===
Country	Date	Appointment	Ribbon	Post-nominal letters	Other
United Kingdom	12 June 1947	Companion of the Order of the Crown of India		CI	
United Kingdom	23 June 1948	Dame of Justice of the Order of St John of Jerusalem		DJStJ	
Netherlands	1948	Grand Cross of the Order of the Netherlands Lion			
United Kingdom	1 June 1953	Dame Grand Cross of the Royal Victorian Order		GCVO	
Zanzibar	1956	Order of the Brilliant Star of Zanzibar, First Class			
United Kingdom	20 June 1956	Dame Grand Cross of the Order of St John of Jerusalem		GCStJ	
Belgium	1960	Grand Cross of the Order of the Crown			
Uganda	1965	Order of the Crown, Lion, and Spear of Toro Kingdom			
Japan	5 October 1971	Order of the Precious Crown, First Class			
United Kingdom	21 August 1990	Recipient of the Royal Victorian Chain			
United Kingdom		Recipient of the Royal Family Order of George V			
United Kingdom		Recipient of the Royal Family Order of George VI			
United Kingdom		Recipient of the Royal Family Order of Elizabeth II			

==== Honorary military appointments ====
Australia

- (Australia) Colonel-in-Chief of the Women's Royal Australian Army Corps

Bermuda

- Colonel-in-Chief of the Bermuda Regiment

Canada

- Colonel-in-Chief of the Royal Highland Fusiliers of Canada
- (Canada) Colonel-in-Chief of the Princess Louise Fusiliers
- (Canada) Colonel-in-Chief of the Royal Newfoundland Regiment

New Zealand

- (New Zealand) Colonel-in-Chief of the Northland Regiment

United Kingdom

- (United Kingdom) Colonel-in-Chief of the 15th/19th The King's Royal Hussars
- (United Kingdom) Colonel-in-Chief of the Light Dragoons
- (United Kingdom) Colonel-in-Chief of the Royal Highland Fusiliers (Princess Margaret's Own Glasgow and Ayrshire Regiment)
- (United Kingdom) Colonel-in-Chief of the Queen Alexandra's Royal Army Nursing Corps
- (United Kingdom) Colonel-in-Chief of the 1st East Anglian Regiment (Royal Norfolk and Suffolk)
- (United Kingdom) Deputy Colonel-in-Chief of the Royal Anglian Regiment
- (United Kingdom) Honorary Air Commodore, Royal Air Force Coningsby
- (United Kingdom) Lady Sponsor of HMS Illustrious
- (United Kingdom) Lady Sponsor of HMS Norfolk

==== Non-national titles and honours ====
===== Scholastic =====
- 1962–1986: Chancellor of Keele University
  - 1956–1962: President of the University College of North Staffordshire (College became Keele University)

====== Honorary academic degrees ======
- 1957: University of London, Doctor of Music
- 1958: University of Cambridge, Doctor of Law
- 1962: Keele University, Doctor of Letters

===== Memberships and fellowships =====
- Royal Society of Medicine, Honorary Fellow

===== Civic =====
- Master of the Bench of Lincoln's Inn

=== Awards ===
- 2003: Queen Elizabeth II Coronation Award

=== Arms ===
Coat of arms of Princess Margaret, Countess of Snowdon
Notes The Princess's personalized coat of arms were those of the Royal coat of arms of the United Kingdom with a label for difference. Adopted 1944 Escutcheon Quarterly 1st and 4th gules three lions passant guardant or 2nd or a lion rampant gules within a double tressure flory counterflory gules 3rd azure a harp or stringed argent Orders The Royal Victorian Order ribbon. VICTORIA Other elements The whole differenced by a label of three points Argent, first and third charged with a Tudor rose the second with a thistle proper Banner The princess's personal standard was that of Royal Standard of the United Kingdom, labelled for difference as in her arms. (in Scotland) Symbolism As with the Royal Arms of the United Kingdom. The first and fourth quarters are the arms of England, the second of Scotland, the third of Ireland.

== Issue ==
Name	Birth	Marriage		Issue
David Armstrong-Jones, 2nd Earl of Snowdon	3 November 1961	8 October 1993; Separated 2020	Serena Stanhope	Charles Armstrong-Jones, Viscount Linley; Lady Margarita Armstrong-Jones
Lady Sarah Armstrong-Jones	1 May 1964	14 July 1994	Daniel Chatto	Samuel Chatto; Arthur Chatto

== Ancestry ==
Ancestors of Princess Margaret, Countess of Snowdon

8. Edward VII of the United Kingdom
4. George V of the United Kingdom
9. Princess Alexandra of Denmark
2. George VI of the United Kingdom
10. Francis, Duke of Teck
5. Princess Victoria Mary of Teck
11. Princess Mary Adelaide of Cambridge
1. Princess Margaret, Countess of Snowdon
12. Claude Bowes-Lyon, 13th Earl of Strathmore and Kinghorne
6. Claude Bowes-Lyon, 14th Earl of Strathmore and Kinghorne
13. Frances Dora Smith
3. Lady Elizabeth Bowes-Lyon
14. Charles Cavendish-Bentinck
7. Cecilia Nina Cavendish-Bentinck
15. Caroline Louisa Burnaby

Princess Margaret, Countess of Snowdon House of Windsor Born: 21 August 1930 Died: 9 February 2002
Academic offices
Preceded by The Earl of Harrowby	President of the University College of North Staffordshire; 1956–1962	College becomes Keele University
New title	Chancellor of Keele University; 1962–1986	Succeeded by The Lord Moser
