= Daniel Chatto =

British artist and actor (born 1957)

- Born: Daniel Chatto St George Sproule; 22 April 1957 (age 69); London, England
- Education: Aldenham School
- Occupation: Actor
- Spouse: Lady Sarah Armstrong-Jones (m. 1994)
- Children: Samuel and Arthur
- Father: Tom Chatto

Daniel St George Chatto (born Daniel Chatto St George Sproule; 22 April 1957) is a British artist and former actor. He is the husband of Lady Sarah Chatto, who is the daughter of Princess Margaret, Countess of Snowdon, and a cousin of King Charles III.

== Biography ==
Daniel was born on 22 April 1957 in London as Daniel Chatto St George Sproule. He is the son of Tom Chatto and Rosalind Joan Chatto. According to The Daily Telegraph, Chatto's biological father is actor and theatrical agent Robin Fox.

He is the uncle of Mae Martin through his half-brother, former child actor James Chatto.

== Marriage ==
On 14 July 1994, Chatto married Lady Sarah Armstrong-Jones. The couple have two sons, Samuel and Arthur.

== Honours ==
Date	Appointment	Ribbon	Note
6 February 2002	Queen Elizabeth II Golden Jubilee Medal		
6 February 2012	Queen Elizabeth II Diamond Jubilee Medal		
6 February 2022:	Queen Elizabeth II Platinum Jubilee Medal		
6 May 2023	King Charles III Coronation Medal		

== Filmography ==
- The Marquise (1980, TV film) as Miguel
- Quartet (1981, directed by James Ivory) as Guy
- Priest of Love (1981) as Aquitania Officer
- To the Manor Born (series finale, 1981) as Heatherington-Poole
- Nancy Astor (1982; based on the life of Nancy Astor) as Billy Grenfell
- Charles & Diana: A Royal Love Story (1982, TV film) as Prince Andrew
- A Shocking Accident (1982, Short) as Paul
- Juliet Bravo (1983, TV series) as Billy Braithwaite
- Heat and Dust (1983, by James Ivory, based on a novel by Ruth Prawer Jhabvala) as Party Guest
- The Razor's Edge (1984; based on a novel by Somerset Maugham) as Wounded French Soldier #1
- A Christmas Carol (1984, TV movie, based on a novel by Charles Dickens) as William
- The Shooting Party (1985) as John
- Dutch Girls (1985, TV movie) as Fforde
- The Death of the Heart (1985, TV film, based on a novel by Elizabeth Bowen) as Eddie
- Little Dorrit (1987; based on a novel by Charles Dickens) as Tip Dorrit (final film role)
