= Tom Chatto =

English actor (1920–1982)

- Chatto in Guy Hamilton's Battle of Britain (1969)
- Born: Thomas Chatto St George Sproule; 1 September 1920; Elstree, Hertfordshire], England
- Died: 8 August 1982 (aged 61); London, England
- Education: Royal Academy of Dramatic Art
- Occupation: Actor
- Spouse: Rosalind Thompson
- Children: 2, including Daniel
- Family: Andrew Chatto (great-grandfather); Lady Sarah Armstrong-Jones (daughter-in-law); Mae Martin (grandchild)

Thomas Chatto St George Sproule (1 September 1920 – 8 August 1982) was an English actor who made numerous appearances on television, film, and stage between 1957 and his death in 1982.

== Early life and career ==
Chatto is a great-grandson of Andrew Chatto (1840–1913) the founder of the publishers Chatto and Windus.

According to a London Palladium souvenir brochure from a 1970 production of Aladdin, he was trained at the Royal Academy of Dramatic Art. During the war he was commissioned in the Indian Army. After the war he maintained the family interest in books and became a director of the firm of booksellers Pickering and Chatto.

Chatto appeared mostly in films, including Oscar Wilde (1960) in which he played the Clerk of Arraigns. He appeared in the 1969 Guy Hamilton film Battle of Britain.

His work in the theatre includes Fings Ain't Wot They Used T'Be, My Fair Lady, Number 10, The Young Visiters and Hushabye. In 1969 he appeared with Tommy Steele and Mary Hopkin in Dick Whittington at The London Palladium and in 1970 was The Emperor of China in Aladdin with Cilla Black, Alfred Marks and Leslie Crowther, and with Alec Guinness in the play Time out of Mind.

He appeared on TV in Honey Lane, The Cedar Tree, The Expert, Happy Ever After, and as Sergeant Grimshaw in Young Sherlock: The Mystery of the Manor House. He had a minor role in the pilot episode of Randall and Hopkirk (Deceased) in 1969 in the episode, "My Late Lamented Friend and Partner".

== Marriage ==
Chatto married Rosalind Joan Thompson, who became a successful talent agent under the name Ros Chatto (died 5 June 2012); the couple had two sons:

- James Chatto father of the stand-up comedian Mae Martin.
- Daniel Chatto who married Lady Sarah Armstrong-Jones, the daughter of Princess Margaret, Countess of Snowdon and Antony Armstrong-Jones, 1st Earl of Snowdon, and the niece of Queen Elizabeth II.

== Filmography ==
Year	Title	Role	Notes
1957	The Girl in the Picture	George Keefe	
1957	Quatermass 2	Broadhead	
1960	Oscar Wilde	Clerk of Arraigns	
1962	The Boys	Morris	
1966	The Frozen Dead	Inspector Witt	
1967	It!	Young Captain	
1969	Battle of Britain	Willoughby's Assistant Controller	
1970	My Lover, My Son	Woods	
1970	The Man Who Had Power Over Women	Doctor	
1971	Assault	Police Doctor	
1971	When Eight Bells Toll	Lord Kirkside	
1974	Galileo	Town Crier	
1975	The Romantic Englishwoman	Neighbour	
1979	The Human Factor	General Phipps	
1981	Lady Killers	Dr. Grierson	Episode: "Make It a Double"
