= David Armstrong-Jones, 2nd Earl of Snowdon =

British businessman and peer (born 1961)

The Right Honourable The Earl of Snowdon
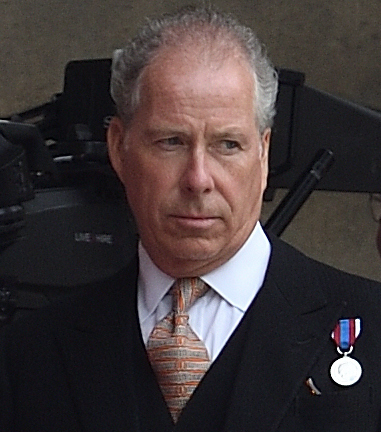
- Armstrong-Jones in 2022
- Born: David Albert Charles Armstrong-Jones; 3 November 1961 (age 65); Clarence House, London, England
- Spouse: Serena Stanhope (m. 1993; sep. 2020)
- Issue: Charles Armstrong-Jones, Viscount Linley; Lady Margarita Armstrong-Jones
- Parents: Princess Margaret of the United Kingdom; Antony Armstrong-Jones, 1st Earl of Snowdon
- Occupation: Entrepreneur
- Education: Bedales School

David Albert Charles Armstrong-Jones, 2nd Earl of Snowdon (born 3 November 1961), styled as Viscount Linley until 2017 and known professionally as David Linley, is a member of the British royal family, an English furniture maker, and honorary chairman of the auction house Christie's. He is the only son of Princess Margaret and Antony Armstrong-Jones, 1st Earl of Snowdon, and through his mother a grandson of King George VI, nephew of Queen Elizabeth II, and first cousin of King Charles III. When he was born, he was fifth in the line of succession to the British throne; as of 2026, he is 27th.

== Early life and education ==
David Albert Charles Armstrong-Jones was born at 10:45 am on 3 November 1961 at Clarence House, London, the son of Princess Margaret and Antony Armstrong-Jones, 1st Earl of Snowdon. He was baptised on 19 December in the Music Room at Buckingham Palace. His godparents were his aunt Queen Elizabeth II, Lady Elizabeth Cavendish, Patrick Plunket, 7th Baron Plunket, Lord Rupert Nevill, and Simon Phipps.

At the age of five, Armstrong-Jones began lessons in the Buckingham Palace schoolroom with his cousin Prince Andrew. He attended several independent schools: first Gibbs Pre-Preparatory School in Kensington, London, now known as Collingham College; followed by the pre-preparatory section of Ashdown House School in East Sussex, then Millbrook House School near Abingdon in Oxfordshire, and finally Bedales School, where he developed a passion for arts and crafts. From 1980 to 1982 he studied at Parnham House in the small town of Beaminster in Dorset, training as a wood craftsman.

He has one full sister, Lady Sarah Chatto (née Armstrong-Jones), and two paternal half-sisters, Lady Frances von Hofmannsthal (née Armstrong-Jones) and Polly Fry. He also has a half-brother, Jasper Cable-Alexander, son of his father and Melanie Cable-Alexander.

== Professional life ==
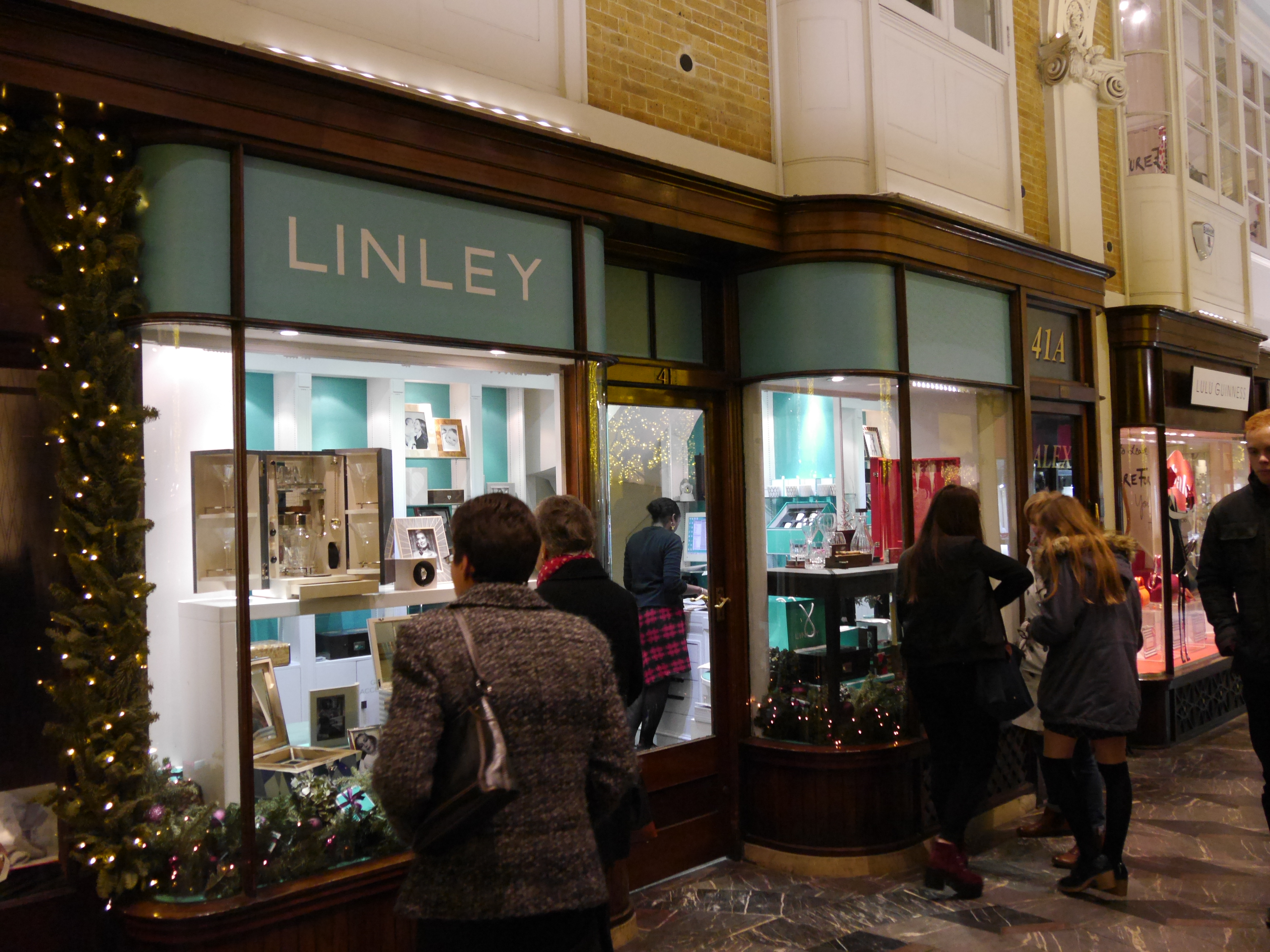
Linley store in Burlington Arcade, London, 2015

Armstrong-Jones opened a workshop in Dorking, where he designed and made furniture for three years before setting up his own company, David Linley Furniture Limited (now known as Linley). The firm produces bespoke furniture, upholstery, and interior design pieces noted for their neoclassical appearance and use of inlaid woods. He has written numerous books and lectured internationally. His work is sold in retail outlets in Belgravia, Harrods, and overseas, including the Bespoke Collection. He borrowed from his company by causing it to make loans, accruing about £3 million in debts. The situation was resolved by the sale of controlling shares for £4 million in 2012, through which he lost control of the company.

On 1 December 2006, Armstrong-Jones became chairman of Christie's UK, having joined the board in 2005 as a non-executive director. In 2015, his position was changed to honorary chairman of Christie's EMERI (Europe, Middle East, Russia, and India).

Armstrong-Jones dabbled in the restaurant business with his friend and second cousin Patrick Lichfield. They established a restaurant called Deals in Chelsea, London. According to Princess Margaret's biographer, Theo Aronson, Armstrong-Jones had a flair for the networking side of business and was successful in attracting customers.

== Candidacy for the House of Lords ==
Armstrong-Jones's father was originally a member of the House of Lords by virtue of his being granted a hereditary peerage. When the House of Lords Act 1999 unseated most hereditary peers, those whose peerage had been newly created for them, rather than inherited, were offered life peerages to allow them to remain in the Lords. Accordingly, the first Earl Snowdon was also created Baron Armstrong-Jones and retained his seat until his death in 2017. His son then inherited the earldom but not the life peerage or the seat.

In 2018, Armstrong-Jones became a candidate in a by-election to fill a vacancy among the crossbench hereditary peers. Only hereditary peers were eligible to stand, and only the 31 hereditary crossbenchers sitting in the Lords at the time were eligible to vote. Unlike other candidates, he did not submit a statement with his announcement of candidacy. He later withdrew from consideration. Reportedly, his candidacy had "raised eyebrows" because of his relation to the royal family.

== Personal life and family ==
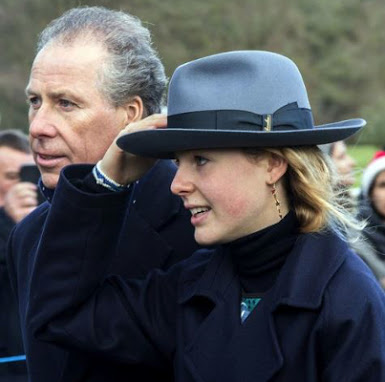
Pictured with his daughter in 2017

During the 1980s, Armstrong-Jones had an eight-year relationship with Susannah Constantine, as discussed in her autobiography.

On 8 October 1993, Armstrong-Jones married the Hon. Serena Alleyne Stanhope (born 1 March 1970, Limerick, Ireland), daughter of Viscount Petersham (later the 12th Earl of Harrington) at St. Margaret's Church, Westminster. There were 650 guests. Through her father, Stanhope descends from Henry FitzRoy, 1st Duke of Grafton, one of the illegitimate children of Charles II of England.

Armstrong-Jones and Stanhope have two children:

- Charles Patrick Inigo Armstrong-Jones, Viscount Linley (born 1 July 1999 at the Portland Hospital in London), an Old Etonian who studied product design engineering at Loughborough University. He is 28th in the line of succession to the British throne.
- Lady Margarita Elizabeth Rose Alleyne Armstrong-Jones (born 14 May 2002 at the Portland Hospital in London), who studied jewellery design, stonesetting, and wax carving at La Haute École de Joaillerie in Paris. She is 29th in the line of succession to the British throne.

From 2000 until 2002, Armstrong-Jones, his wife and son lived at Kensington Palace with his mother, Princess Margaret, during her declining years. On 8 April 2002, Armstrong-Jones, along with the Prince of Wales, the Duke of York, and the Earl of Wessex, "stood guard" at the lying-in-state of their grandmother, Queen Elizabeth the Queen Mother. This Vigil of the Princes had taken place only once before, during the lying-in-state of George V in 1936.

In 2011, Armstrong-Jones's daughter was a bridesmaid at the wedding of Prince William and Catherine Middleton. In 2012, his son, styled by courtesy as Viscount Linley since January 2017, was appointed by the Queen as a page of honour.

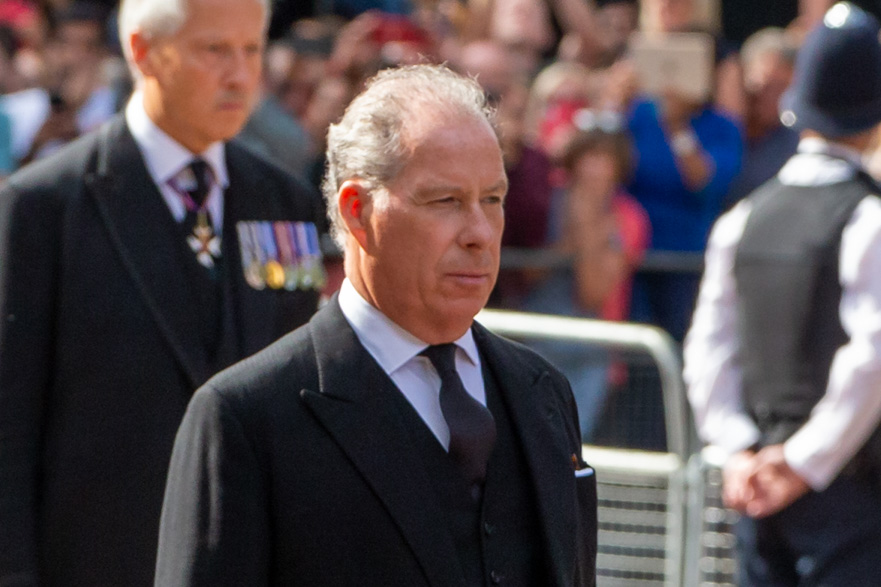
Armstrong-Jones in the procession to the lying in state of his aunt Queen Elizabeth II in 2022

He has three homes: a flat in Chelsea, London; a cottage on the Daylesford estate in Gloucestershire; and the Château d'Autet in the Luberon, Provence.

In February 2020, Armstrong-Jones and Stanhope announced their separation and stated that they intended to divorce.

In September 2022, Armstrong-Jones took part in the procession to Westminster Hall for the lying-in-state of his aunt, Queen Elizabeth II, and in the procession to Westminster Abbey for her funeral.

In the summer of 2024, he began a relationship with art dealer, advisor, and curator Isabelle de la Bruyère (born September 1971). She is a great-granddaughter of French aircraft designer and Olympic sailor Louis Charles Breguet and has a son from a previous relationship. The couple have made public appearances together, one of the first being at the Chelsea Flower Show in May 2025.

== Legal matters ==
In 1990, he took legal action against the Today newspaper for an article accusing him of "rowdy behaviour in a pub". He was awarded £30,000 in damages.

In October and November 2007, rumours circulated online suggesting that a member of the British royal family was the victim of blackmail. The first confirmation that the royal involved was Armstrong-Jones came from the journalist Nicholas Davies. Ian Strachan and Sean McGuigan attempted to extort £50,000 from him in September by threatening to release video footage showing sex acts and cocaine use (allegedly involving Armstrong-Jones and a male royal aide) on a mobile phone. Armstrong-Jones contacted the police. Strachan and McGuigan were arrested after showing their footage to an undercover detective, and at trial were sentenced to five years in prison.

== Titles, styles, honours and arms ==
=== Titles and styles ===
- 3 November 1961 – 13 January 2017: Viscount Linley
- 13 January 2017 – present: The Right Honourable The Earl of Snowdon

=== Honours ===
Date	Appointment	Ribbon	Note
6 February 1977	Recipient of the Queen Elizabeth II Silver Jubilee Medal		
6 February 2002	Recipient of the Queen Elizabeth II Golden Jubilee Medal		
6 February 2012	Recipient of the Queen Elizabeth II Diamond Jubilee Medal		
6 February 2022	Recipient of the Queen Elizabeth II Platinum Jubilee Medal		
6 May 2023	Recipient of the King Charles III Coronation Medal		

=== Arms ===
Coat of arms of David Armstrong-Jones, 2nd Earl of Snowdon
Notes Aside from the earl's coronet displayed here, he is also entitled to display the coronet of a child of a daughter of the sovereign. Crest A stag statant Gules attired collared and unguled Or between two arms embowed in armour the hands Proper each grasping a fleur-de-lis Or. Escutcheon Sable on a chevron Argent between in chief two fleurs-de-lis and in base an eagle displayed Or four pallets Gules. Supporters Dexter a griffin and sinister an eagle each with wings elevated and addorsed Or. Motto A Noddo Duw A Noddir (Welsh: "What God wills will be")

== Published works ==
- Linley, David. Classical Furniture. Harry N. Abrams, 1993. ISBN 978-0810931886.
- Linley, David. Extraordinary Furniture. Harry N. Abrams, 1996. ISBN 978-0810932579.
- Linley, David. Design and Detail in the Home. Harry N. Abrams, 2000. ISBN 978-0810940536.
- Linley, David; Charles Cator and Helen Chislett. The Enduring Beauty of Spectacular Furniture. The Monacelli Press, 2009. ISBN 978-1580932592.
- Miller, Judith. Foreword by David Linley. World Styles from Classical to Contemporary. Dorling Kindersley, 2005. ISBN 978-0756613402.
- Niagara Foundation. Introductions by Viscount Linley, Julian Smith, and Peter Strokes. Early Architecture of the Town and Township of Niagara. Dundurn Press, 2015. ISBN 978-1927371404.
- Reginato, James. Foreword by Viscount Linley. Great Houses, Modern Aristocrats. Rizzoli, 2016. ISBN 978-0847848980.

David Armstrong-Jones, 2nd Earl of Snowdon Born: 3 November 1961
Lines of succession
Preceded by Lucas Tindall	Succession to the British throne 27th in line	Succeeded by Viscount Linley
Orders of precedence in the United Kingdom
Preceded by The Duke of Kent	as a member of the royal family The Earl of Snowdon	Succeeded by Prince Michael of Kent
Peerage of the United Kingdom
Preceded by Antony Armstrong-Jones	Earl of Snowdon; 2017–present	Incumbent; Heir apparent: Charles Armstrong-Jones, Viscount Linley
