= Maud Messel =

British artist and horticulturalist (1875–1960)

Maud Messel MBE
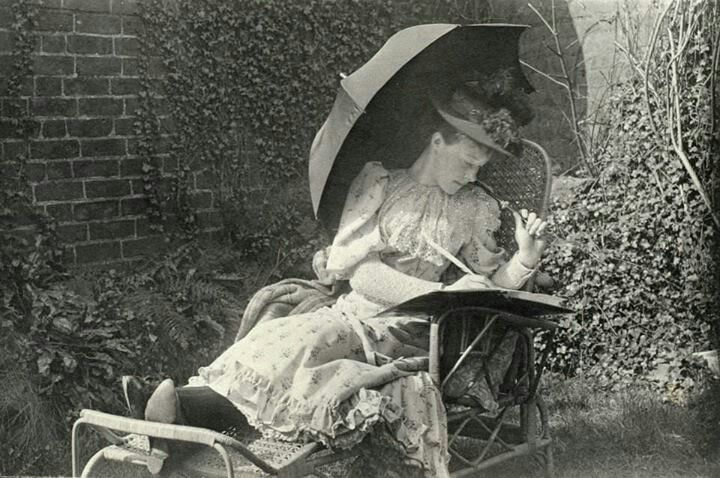
- Born: Maud Frances Sambourne; August 5, 1875; Kensington
- Died: March 8, 1960 (aged 84)
- Spouse: Leonard Messel (m. 1898)
- Children: Linley Messel; Anne Parsons, Countess of Rosse; Oliver Messel
- Parents: Edward Linley Sambourne (father); Mary Herapath (mother)

Maud Frances Messel MBE (née Sambourne; 5 August 1875 – 8 March 1960) was a British artist and horticulturalist. She was awarded an MBE for her work with the Red Cross in World War I.

== Biography ==
Maud Frances Sambourne was born on 5 August 1875 in Kensington, the daughter of Punch cartoonist Edward Linley Sambourne and Marion Herapath Sambourne. She grew up in Sambourne House.

Samboure had lessons from artist Blanche Vicat-Cole and published her first drawing in Punch in 1892, followed by drawings in Pall Mall Magazine in 1894. She also provided illustrations for a pair of books of fantastic stories: Fantasies (1896) by Mabel Nembhard and Cherriwink: a fairy story (1897) by Rachel Penn.

During World War I, Maud Messel was commandant of the Knowle Auxiliary Hospital, a 20-bed military hospital, in Balcombe, West Sussex near the Mussel's country home Balcombe House. Hundreds of wounded soldiers were treated at the Knowle hospital.

Messel died on 8 March 1960.

=== Marriage and issue ===
She married German stockbroker Leonard Charles Rudolph Messel (1872–1953) on 20 April 1898.

Maud and Leonard Messel had three children:

- Linley Francis Messel (1899–1971), British Army officer
- Anne Parsons, Countess of Rosse (1902–1992), mother of Antony Armstrong-Jones, 1st Earl of Snowdon and Brendan Parsons, 7th Earl of Rosse.
- Oliver Hilary Sambourne Messel (1904–1974), artist and stage designer

=== Residences ===
Following their marriage, Leonard and Maud Messell purchased No. 27 Gloucester Terrace as their London home, and Balcombe House in Sussex. As their family grew, they later took a larger town residence at No. 104 Lancaster Gate, Bayswater, where Maud hosted the wedding reception of her daughter Anne Messel to Ronald Armstrong-Jones in 1925, and later the wedding reception of her granddaughter Susan Armstrong-Jones to John Vesey (later 6th Viscount de Vesci) in 1950.

Following the death of Maud's father-in-law Ludwig Messell in 1915, Leonard inherited the family's Sussex estate Nymans, where Maud built a widely praised garden featuring old garden roses.
