= Thomas Vesey, 7th Viscount de Vesci =

Irish noble, born 1955

The Rt Hon. Thomas Eustace Vesey, 7th Viscount de Vesci and 8th Baron Knapton (born 8 October 1955), is an Irish peer.

== Early life ==
Lord de Vesci is the son of the 6th Viscount de Vesci and the former Susan Anne Armstrong-Jones, sister of the 1st Earl of Snowdon. In addition to being a nephew of the 1st Earl of Snowdon, he is a grand-nephew of the 6th Earl of Kenmare.

== Career ==
Lord de Vesci sold Abbeyleix Castle, saddled with £1.5 million in death duties, in 1994 to the financier Sir David Davies.

Despite the sale of Abbeyleix House and Estate, Lord de Vesci continues to promote the heritage of the town of Abbeyleix. In 2012, he gave an interview about his family's connection to the town of Abbeyleix to Glenda Gilson for Irishheritagetowns.com.

== Marriage and family ==
On 5 September 1987, Lord de Vesci married Sita-Maria Arabella, daughter of Brian Michael Leese, later de Breffny, of Castletown Cox, County Kilkenny, an English genealogist (of English-Jewish and Irish heritage), by his wife Maharaj Kumari Jyotsna Dutt, daughter of Maharajadhiraja Bahadur Sir Uday Chand Mahtab, last ruler of Burdwan Raj. They have three children:

1. Damian John Vesey (born 1985; before his parents' marriage, so not in the line of succession)
2. Hon. Cosima Frances Vesey (born 1988), who gave birth to a son with hotelier André Balazs, Ivo Vesey (born 9 July 2017)
3. Hon. Oliver Ivo Vesey (born 16 July 1991), heir apparent

Peerage of Ireland
Preceded by John Vesey	Viscount de Vesci; 1983–present	Incumbent; Heir apparent: Hon. Oliver Vesey
Preceded by John Vesey	Baron Knapton; 1983–present	Incumbent; Heir apparent: Hon. Oliver Vesey
Baronetage of Ireland
Preceded by John Vesey	Baronet of Abbeyleix; 1983–present	Incumbent; Heir apparent: Hon. Oliver Vesey
