= The Victorian Society =

Organisation to protect architecture in England and Wales

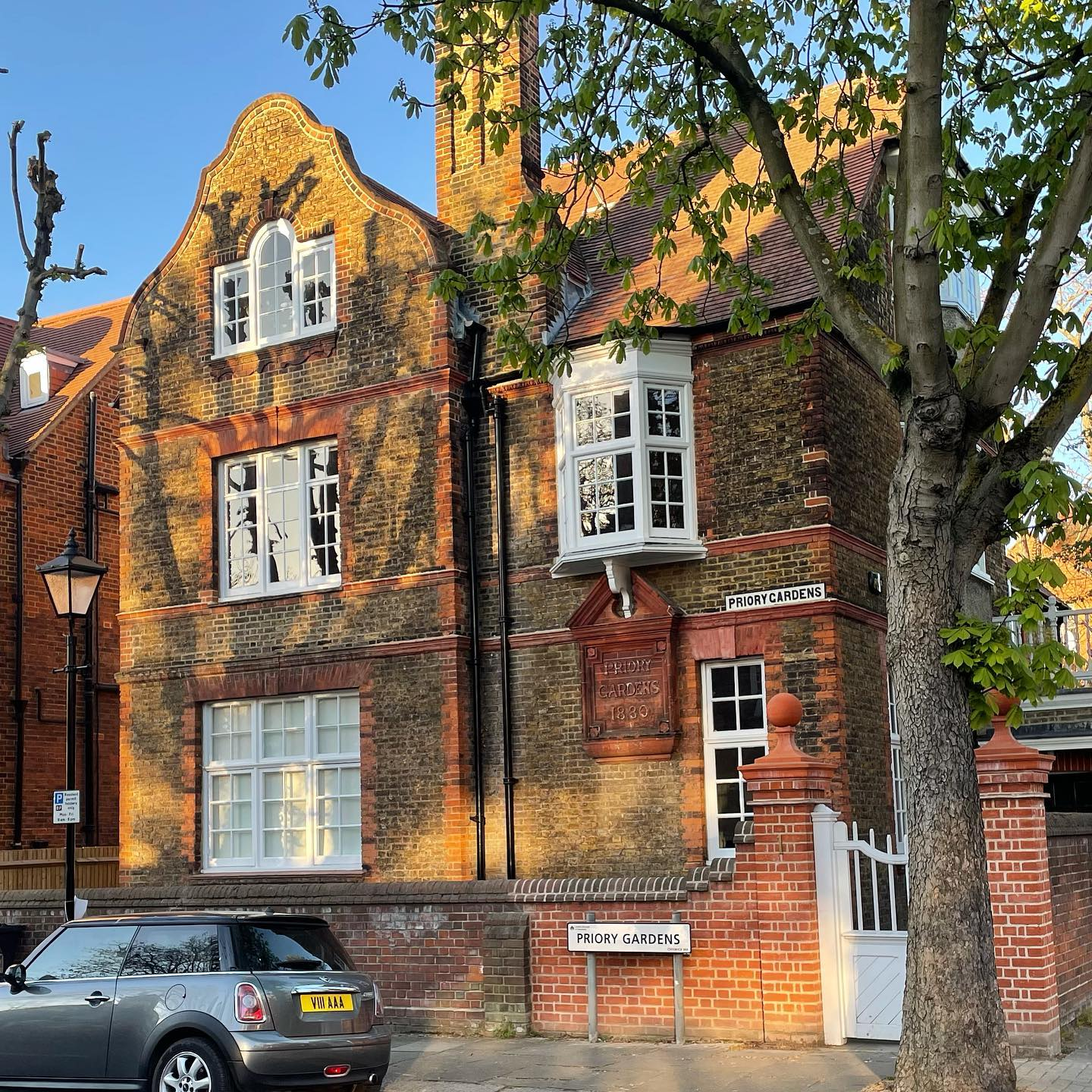
- The society's headquarters, 1 Priory Gardens, Bedford Park, London, built 1880 by E. J. May in British Queen Anne Revival style
- Nickname: The Vic Soc
- Formation: 1958
- Headquarters: 1 Priory Gardens, London, England
- Director: James Hughes
- Chair of Trustees: James Grierson
- Patron: The Duke of Gloucester KG, GCVO
- President: Griff Rhys Jones
- Key people: Sir David Cannadine FBA FRSL FRHistS; Harry Handelsman Lord Howarth of Newport CBE PC Sir Simon Jenkins FRSL (Vice-Presidents)
- Website: victoriansociety.org.uk

The Victorian Society is a UK charity and amenity society that campaigns to preserve and promote interest in Victorian and Edwardian architecture and heritage built between 1837 and 1914 in England and Wales. As a statutory consultee, by law it must be notified of any work to a listed building which involves any element of demolition or structural alteration.

== Goals ==
The society, a registered charity, fights to protect Victorian and Edwardian heritage from demolition or careless alteration. As a membership organisation, the majority of its funding comes from subscription fees and events. As one of the National Amenity Societies, The Victorian Society is a statutory consultee on alterations to listed buildings, and by law must be notified of any work to a listed building which involves any element of demolition.

The society:

- Provides advice to churches and local planning authorities on how Victorian and Edwardian buildings and landscapes can be adapted to modern use, while keeping what is distinctive about them.
- Advises members of the public on how they can help shape the future of their local Victorian and Edwardian buildings and landscapes.
- Provides information to owners of Victorian and Edwardian houses about how they can better look after their buildings.
- Helps people understand, appreciate and enjoy the architectural heritage of the Victorian and Edwardian period through its publications and events.

== History ==
=== Foundation ===
The society's foundation was proposed in November 1957 by Anne Parsons, Countess of Rosse at her preserved Victorian home at 18 Stafford Terrace, Kensington (Linley Sambourne House), with the intention of countering the widely prevalent antipathy to 19th- and early 20th-century architecture. (Note: Timothy Mowl, the architectural historian, records that Anne Rosse's house, with its decoration by her grandfather Linley Sambourne, had "the most stunning and completely unaltered Victorian interiors" in London.) From the 1890s into the 20th century, Victorian art had been under attack, critics writing of "the nineteenth century architectural tragedy", ridiculing "the uncompromising ugliness" of the era's buildings and attacking the "sadistic hatred of beauty" of its architects. The commonly held view had been expressed by P. G. Wodehouse in his 1937 novel, Summer Moonshine: "Whatever may be said in favour of the Victorians, it is pretty generally admitted that few of them were to be trusted within reach of a trowel and a pile of bricks."

The first meeting was held at Linley Sambourne House on 28 February 1958. Among its 30 founder members were the first secretary, together with John Betjeman, Henry-Russell Hitchcock and Nikolaus Pevsner, who became chairman in 1964.

=== Directors ===
Peter Fleetwood-Hesketh was secretary from 1961 to 1963. Former Bletchley Park codebreaker, Jane Fawcett, then managed the society's affairs as secretary from 1964 to 1976. William Filmer-Sankey served as its director in the 1990s, Ian Dungavell was appointed as director in October 2000, and Christopher Costelloe took over as director in August 2012. Joe O'Donnell became director in September 2020, and was replaced by James Hughes in February 2024.

== Work ==
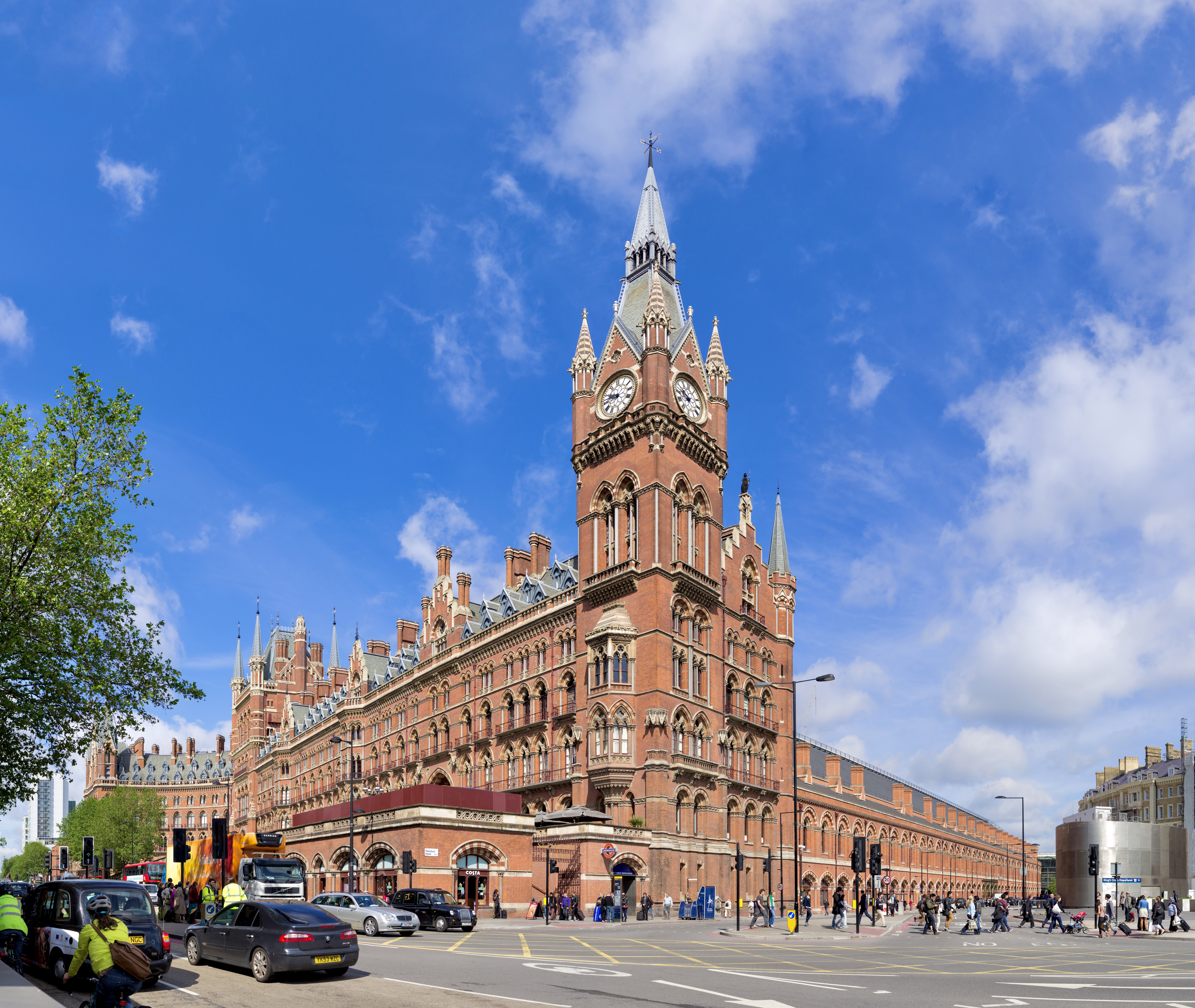
The society helped to save St Pancras Station from demolition.

The society has worked to save numerous landmark buildings such as St Pancras Station, Royal Albert Dock in Liverpool, the Foreign & Commonwealth Office and Oxford University Museum. Its campaigns have not always been successful, notably its failed attempts to save the Euston Arch from demolition in 1961 or the Coal Exchange from the same fate in 1962.

Examples of the society's work with churches include making complaints against proposals of church PCCs to use upholstered chairs during renovation, and appealing against proposals to raise money by selling original features.

In 2015, the society launched a campaign to preserve Victorian gasometers, after utility companies announced plans to demolish nearly 200 of the now-outdated structures. Costelloe, the society's director at the time, commented: "Gasometers, by their very size and structure, cannot help but become landmarks. [They] are singularly dramatic structures for all their emptiness."

The society publishes an annual list of the Top Ten Most Endangered Victorian or Edwardian Buildings in England and Wales.

== The Victorian magazine ==
Published three times a year since 1998 for the members of the society, The Victorian magazine contains book reviews, society news and events, casework reports, and interviews.

== Victorian Society in America ==
The Victorian Society has a sister organization in the United States, the Victorian Society in America, founded in 1966 in New York City, by such champions of historic preservation as Brendan Gill, Henry-Russell Hitchcock, and Margot Gayle; it was borne from the outrage they felt at the 1964 destruction of New York's Pennsylvania Station. As of 2026, the Victorian Society in America is based in Haddonfield, New Jersey with 10 registered chapters, mostly in the Eastern United States.

== Counterpart bodies ==
The counterpart organisations to the society for the protection of the heritage of earlier and later periods are the Georgian Group (for buildings erected between 1700 and 1840) and The Twentieth Century Society (for post-1914 buildings).

== See also ==
- British industrial architecture
- British Queen Anne Revival architecture
- Gothic Revival architecture
- Victorian house

== Sources ==
- Clark, Kenneth (1983). The Gothic Revival: An Essay in the History of Taste. London: John Murray. ISBN 978-0-719-53102-6.
- Ferriday, Peter (1963). Victorian Architecture. London: Jonathan Cape. OCLC 270335.
- Harries, Susie (2011). Nikolaus Pevsner - The Life. London: Chatto & Windus. ISBN 978-0-701-16839-1.
- Harries, Susie, ed. (2015). Pevsner and Victorian Architecture. London: The Victorian Society. ISBN 978-0-901-65754-1.
- Mowl, Timothy (2000). Stylistic Cold Wars: Betjeman versus Pevsner. London: John Murray. ISBN 978-0-719-55909-9.
- Turnor, Reginald (1950). Nineteenth Century Architecture in Britain. Batsford. OCLC 520344.
