= Oliver Messel =

English artist (1904–1978)

- Oliver Messel by Gordon Anthony, 1937
- Born: 13 January 1904; London, England
- Died: 13 July 1978 (aged 74); Barbados
- Known for: Stage design
- Partner: Vagn Riis-Hansen
- Awards: Tony Award

Oliver Hilary Sambourne Messel (13 January 1904 – 13 July 1978) was an English artist and one of the foremost stage designers of the 20th century.

== Early life ==
Messel was born in London, the second son of Lieutenant-Colonel Leonard Messel and Maud Messel, the only daughter of Linley Sambourne, the illustrator and contributor to Punch magazine. Oliver Messel was educated at Hawtreys, a boarding preparatory school, then in Kent, Westminster School, Eton and the Slade School of Fine Art, University College. Messel was the brother of Linley Messel (1899–1971) and Anne Parsons, Countess of Rosse (8 February 1902 – 3 July 1992), previously Armstrong-Jones and the mother of Lord Snowdon.

== Painting, stage design ==
After completing his studies, he became a portrait painter and commissions for theatre work soon followed, beginning with his designing the masks for a London production of Serge Diaghilev's ballet Zephyr et Flore (1925). Subsequently, he created masks, costumes, and sets – many of which have been preserved by the Theatre Museum, London – for various works staged by C. B. Cochran's revues through the late 1920s and early 1930s. His work as a set designer was also featured in the US in such Broadway shows as The Country Wife (1936); The Lady's Not For Burning (1950); Romeo and Juliet (1951); House of Flowers (1954), for which he won the Tony Award; and Rashomon (1959), which was nominated for a Tony Award for his costume as well as his set design. He also designed the costumes for Romeo and Juliet; Rashomon; and Gigi (1973), the latter two receiving Tony Award nominations.

For film his costume designs include The Private Life of Don Juan (1934); Scarlet Pimpernel (1934); Romeo and Juliet (1936); The Thief of Bagdad (1940); and Caesar and Cleopatra (1945). For Romeo and Juliet he also served as Set Decorator. He was Art Director on Caesar and Cleopatra (1945), On Such a Night (1956) and Production Designer on Suddenly Last Summer (1959), for which he was nominated for the Academy Award.

== Wartime camouflage ==
During the Second World War Messel served as a camouflage officer, disguising pillboxes in Somerset. According to his fellow officer Julian Trevelyan, he revelled in the opportunity to give his talents free rein. The disguises of his pillboxes included haystacks, castles, ruins, and roadside cafes.

== Post-war career ==
In 1946, Messel designed the sets and costumes for the Royal Ballet's new and highly successful production of Tchaikovsky's ballet, choreographed by Marius Petipa, The Sleeping Beauty, a production which famously starred Margot Fonteyn. It became the first production of the ballet shown on American television, on the program Producers' Showcase. That production, the first ever televised in colour, survives on black-and-white kinescope and has been released on DVD. In 2006, it was revived by the Royal Ballet, starring Alina Cojocaru, with some new additions to the scenic design by Peter Farmer, and released on DVD.

In 1953, he was commissioned to design the decor for a suite at London's elegant Dorchester Hotel, one in which he would be happy to live himself. The lavishly ornate Oliver Messel Suite, which the hotel advertises as Elizabeth Taylor's favourite place to stay in London, combines baroque and rococo styles with modernist sensibility and a considerable dose of fantasy. The suite, along with other suites that he designed in the Dorchester, are preserved as part of Britain's national heritage. It was restored in the 1980s by many of the original craftsmen, overseen by Messel's nephew, Lord Snowdon (Antony Armstrong-Jones), the former husband of Princess Margaret. By the mid 50s, despite his earlier acclaim, Messel's set designs were viewed in the UK as tired and escapist in comparison to designs that aimed for photographic realism, which were popular at the time.

Messel also contributed to retail design, creating the new Delman shoe store for H. & M. Rayne in Old Bond Street in 1960. Whereas upmarket shoe stores had been discreet enclaves dressed with curtains and pot plants, while shoes were consigned to underground stores, this radical refit incorporated display stands and cases, some of them illuminated, to show off hundreds of pairs of shoes. An article in The Observer noted that: "Mr Messel and Mr Rayne are at one in thinking that shoes to buy should be as easy to see and handle as books in a library".

== Messel and the Caribbean ==
Oliver Messel came from a wealthy, well-connected family, and when his nephew, Antony Armstrong-Jones (Lord Snowdon), married Princess Margaret, a lifelong relationship with the British royal family began. Messel designed Les Jolies Eaux, Princess Margaret's home on Mustique Island in The Grenadines (a 45 min flight west of Barbados), and "Point Lookout", a stone beach house on the northern tip of Mustique.

In 1966, Messel, exhausted by a demanding theatre season and recurring arthritis, retreated to Barbados. He was 62 and at the peak of his career spanning three decades where he entertained theatre-goers with his stage sets and costumes. The warmth, colour and vibrancy of the tropics seemed to liberate new sources of energy and imagination, leading him to what eventually became a whole new career in designing, building and transforming homes. Not content to rest there, he also designed many furnishings for these homes, particularly for outdoor use.

Messel bought an existing house called Maddox, a simple bay house perched above a small beach on the St. James coast. With the help of his companion Vagn Riis-Hansen, with whom he had a 30-year relationship, and a Barbadian staff, Messel transformed it using the trademarks of his theatrical design: slender Greek columns, flattened arches, white-on-white interiors splashed with bright spots of colour, elaborate plaster mouldings – an easy mix of baroque and classical. It was his use of the materials and traditions of island architecture that was truly innovative. Wealthy friends commissioned Messel to design houses for them, both on Barbados and Mustique, and thus began what architect Barbara Hill described as "his work … of converting quite ordinary houses into wonderlands". As well as his own home, Maddox, he re-designed and supervised the renovations of Leamington House and Pavilion (for the Heinz family), Crystal Springs, Cockade House, Alan Bay and Fustic House. He designed and built Mango Bay from scratch and was commissioned by the Barbados government to restore the old British officers Garrison headquarters in Queens Park, creating an elegant adaptation of it to a theatre and art gallery.

He would probably have gone on to do more on Barbados, but was lured away by his friend Colin Tennant and his private island home, Mustique. Glenconner commissioned Messel to design all the houses built on the island. Between 1960 and 1978 Messel created some 30 house plans, of which over 18 have so far been built. Barbados remained his first island love and his home, and he died there in 1978, at the age of 74.

A lasting result of his influence is the light sage green shade of paint known as 'Messel Green' by paint companies in the Caribbean. Many property owners choose this colour because it is widely associated with local Caribbean style.

== Personal life ==
Messel was gay at a time when same-sex relationships between men were criminalised in Britain. His wealth and social connections enabled him to be relatively open about his sexuality among family and friends, although his long-term partner, Vagn Riis-Hansen, has often been omitted from biographical accounts of his life. They were life-long partners.

Riis-Hansen was involved in Messel's later domestic and design life. In 1964 the couple bought Maddox, an eighteenth-century plantation house in Barbados, which Messel later transformed into his own home and one of the starting points for his Caribbean architectural work.

Messel died in Barbados in 1978. His and Riis-Hansen's ashes are together at Nymans, the Messel family home in West Sussex; in 2024 the National Trust, which now owns Nymans, added Riis-Hansen's name to the memorial there.

== Bibliography ==
- Castle, Charles. Oliver Messel: A Biography. New York: Thames and Hudson, 1986.
- Pinkham, Roger. Oliver Messel. London: Victoria and Albert Museum, 1983.
- Messel, Thomas. Oliver Messel, in the Theatre of Design. New York and London. [Rizzoli] 2011.
- Musson, Jeremy. Fustic House & Estate – A Messel Masterpiece. (Available to read in The London Library), 2010.
