= John Vesey, 6th Viscount de Vesci =

British peer, Lieutenant (1919–1983)

John Eustace Vesey, 6th Viscount de Vesci (25 February 1919 – 13 October 1983), was an Irish peer.

== Early life ==
He was the son of Lt. Col. Hon. Thomas Eustace Vesey and Lady Cecily Kathleen Browne, daughter of Valentine Browne, 5th Earl of Kenmare. He was the great-grandson of Thomas Vesey, 3rd Viscount de Vesci. His father was an Eton and Oxford-educated Lieutenant Colonel in the Irish Guards who fought and was wounded twice in the First World War.

== Career ==
He became the Viscount de Vesci of Abbey Leix on 16 August 1958. He succeeded his paternal uncle, the 5th Viscount, who was survived by his widow, Lois (daughter of Sir Cecil Edmund Lister-Kaye, 4th Bt., and widow a first time of the 5th Earl of Rosse and mother of the 6th Earl of Rosse).

A soldier in the Irish Guards, he fought in the Second World War and was captured.

He lived at Abbey Leix House on the River Nore in County Laois. In 1967, he sold the De Vesci Collection that was housed at Abbey Leix House to the National Library of Australia. This acquisition added 1,648 books (about 2,900 volumes) and 54 serials (about 390 volumes) to the National Library of Australia.

== Marriage and children ==
He was the brother-in-law of Antony Armstrong-Jones, 1st Earl of Snowdon, having married Snowdon's older sister, Susan Anne Armstrong-Jones, on 20 May 1950. She was the daughter of barrister Ronald Armstrong-Jones and of Anne Parsons, Countess of Rosse. When she married Lord de Vesci, she converted to Catholicism. Her wedding dress was designed by her mother. The reception was held at the home of her paternal grandmother, Lady Armstrong-Jones, in Lancaster Gate. The couple had four children:

1. Hon. Emma Frances Vesey (born 17 March 1951)
2. Hon. Catherine Anne Vesey (born 19 May 1953)
3. Thomas Eustace Vesey, 7th Viscount de Vesci (born 8 October 1955)
4. Hon. Georgina Mary Vesey (2 September 1963 – 14 March 1965)

Miss Catherine Vesey was one of the bridesmaids at the wedding of Princess Margaret and Antony Armstrong-Jones on 24 March 1960.

Lady de Vesci died from cancer three years after her husband, in May 1986.

== Other titles ==
He was the 8th baronet of the Vesey of Abbey Leix, which baronetcy was created on 28 September 1698.

Peerage of Ireland
Preceded by Yvo Vesey	Viscount de Vesci; 1958–1983	Succeeded by Thomas Vesey
Preceded by Yvo Vesey	Baron Knapton; 1958–1983	Succeeded by Thomas Vesey
Baronetage of Ireland
Preceded by Yvo Vesey	Baronet of Abbeyleix; 1958–1983	Succeeded by Thomas Vesey
