= Sambourne House =

Grade II* listed building in Kensington, London

Coordinates: 51°30′01.7″N 0°11′49″W

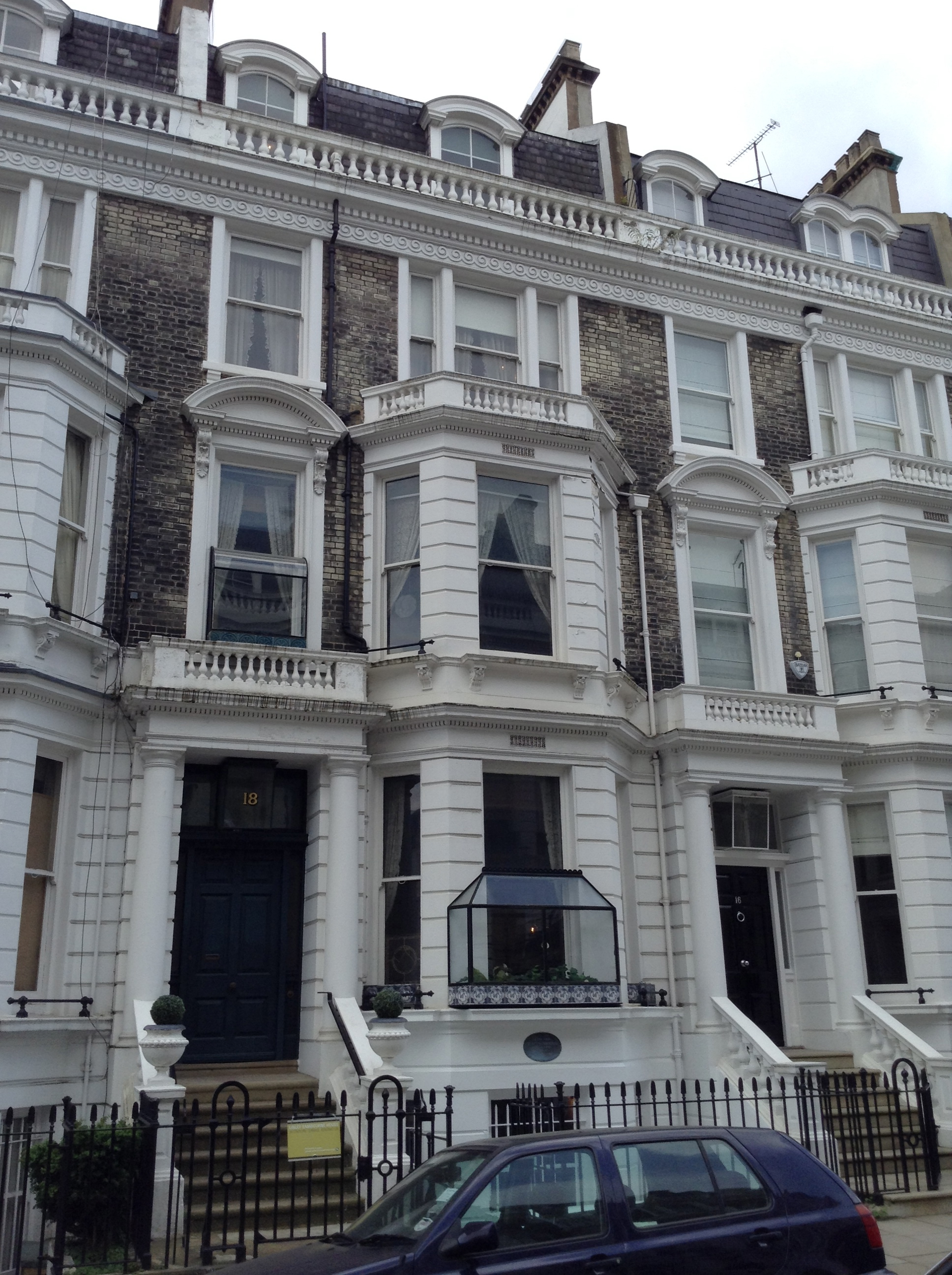
18 Stafford Terrace

Sambourne House, previously known as 18 Stafford Terrace and Linley Sambourne House, was the home of the Punch illustrator Edward Linley Sambourne (1844–1910) in Kensington, London. The house, now Grade II* listed, is currently open to the public as a museum.

In 1875 when the Sambournes moved in, 18 Stafford Terrace was an almost new townhouse. Linley Sambourne and his wife Marion set about re-decorating the house in the Aesthetic style. Today the house is a fine example of middle-class Aestheticism; its influences can still be seen permeating throughout the house, from decorative sunflower motifs in the stained glass windows, to the fine selection of William Morris wallpapers that hang within the rooms, through to the displayed collection of blue-and-white Chinese import porcelain.

== Legacy ==
Linley Sambourne died in 1910 but it was not until Marion's death four years later that the house passed to their bachelor son Roy. Roy kept the house's interior largely unchanged until his own death in 1946. The house then passed to Roy's sister Maud Messel. Maud already had a large London residence, and so 18 Stafford Terrace remained mostly unoccupied and unchanged. In the years leading up to Maud's death in 1960, the house had become increasingly fascinating to her daughter Anne, Countess of Rosse. This fascination led to Anne proposing the foundation of the Victorian Society in 1957, and in turn the continued preservation of the house largely as it had been lived in by Linley.

Lady Rosse negotiated the sale of the house to the Greater London Council and the lease to the Victorian Society in 1980. The house was then opened to the public as a museum which included the furniture, art, and decorative schemes retained from its original inhabitants, Linley Sambourne and his household. Following the demise of the Greater London Council the ownership of the house transferred to the Royal Borough of Kensington and Chelsea in 1989. The Royal Borough continued to work with the Victorian Society until 2000, when the lease to the Victorian Society was not renewed. In 2022 the house was re-opened to the public by the council after a lengthy restoration and conversion of the kitchens into reception areas for visitors.

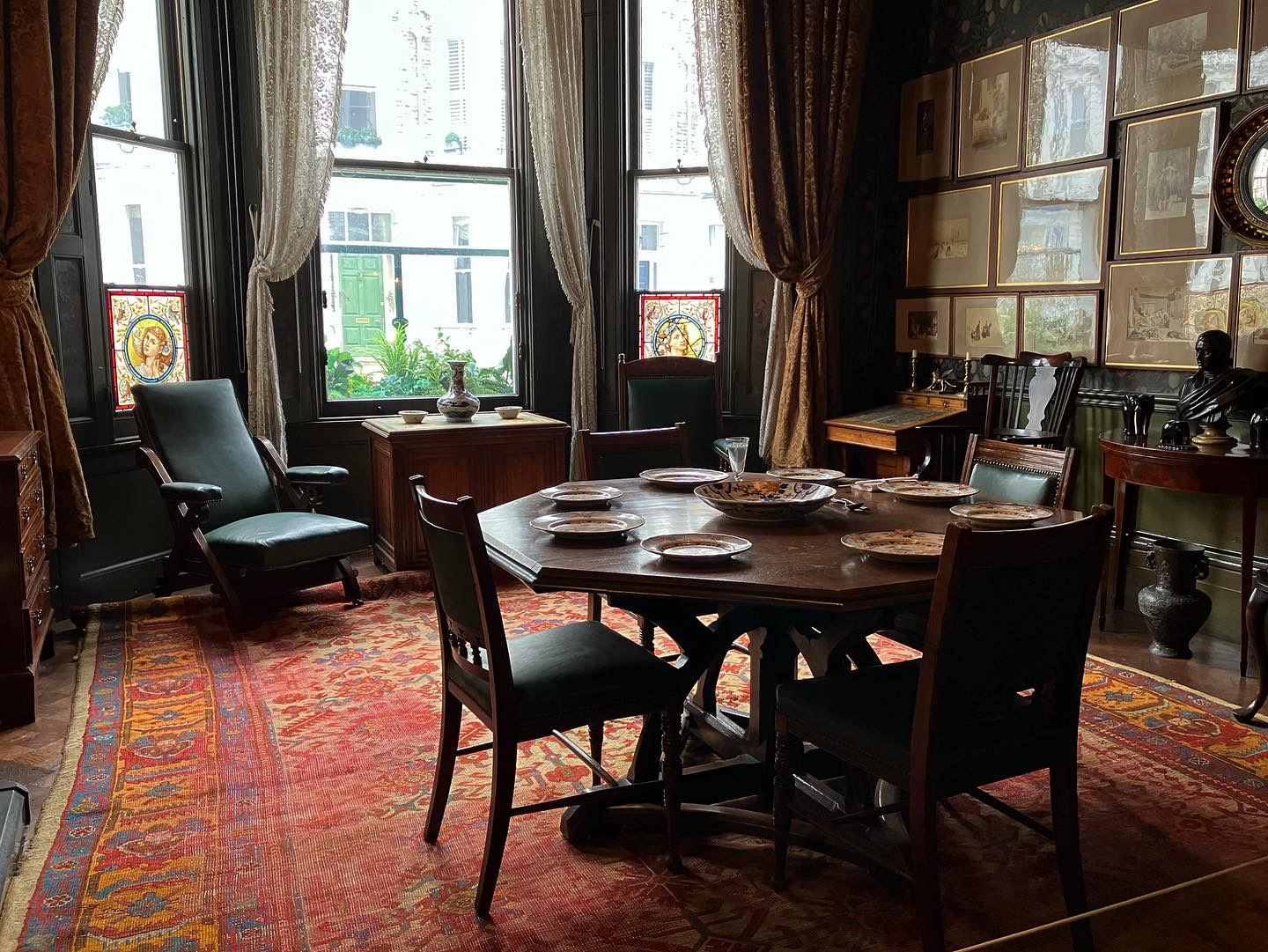
Sambourne House interior

== Sambourne family archive ==
The archive is made up of personal papers relating to Edward Linley Sambourne, members of his family and their home at 18 Stafford Terrace. Dating from 1815 to the present day it includes diaries, letters, legal and financial papers, photographs and ephemera which give insights into both Sambourne's professional and upper-middle-class family life in the later Victorian/Edwardian period. The archive is held at Leighton House Museum.

== In film and television ==
- 18 Stafford Terrace served as the set for the interiors of Mrs. Vyse's London home in the Merchant Ivory film A Room with a View.
- Roy's room served as a set for Maurice, the 1987 British romantic drama film directed by James Ivory.
- The house appears several times in the 1990s British comedy-drama television series Jeeves and Wooster as the home of one of Bertie's terrifying aunts.
- In the 1981 TV series Brideshead Revisited the interiors are shown as the home of Charles Ryder's father, although a different house exterior is used.
- The house has featured in Arthur & George (2015), a three-part British television drama based on the book of the same name by Julian Barnes.
- The house is seen in Life in Squares (2015), a three-part British television drama series that centres on the lives and loves of the extraordinary Bloomsbury Group.

== Bibliography ==
- Nicholson, Shirley (2010). A Victorian Household: Based on the Diaries of Marion Sambourne. Barwin Press. ISBN 978-0-902242-78-4.
- Ormond, Leonee (2010). Linley Sambourne: Illustrator and Punch Cartoonist. Paul Holberton. ISBN 978-1-907372-03-2.
- Robbins, Daniel (2006). "Stopping the clock: the preservation and presentation of Linley Sambourne House, 18 Stafford Terrace". In Keeble, Trevor; Martin, Brenda; Sparke, Penny (eds.). The modern period room: the construction of the exhibited interior 1870 to 1950. Taylor & Francis. pp. 46–58. ISBN 0-415-37469-3.
- Robbins, Daniel; Suleman, Reena; Hunter, Pamela (2003). Linley Sambourne House: 18 Stafford Terrace, Kensington. The Royal Borough of Kensington and Chelsea. ISBN 0-902242-20-2.
- Stourton, James (2012). Great Houses of London. London: Frances Lincoln. ISBN 978-0-7112-3366-9.
- Public Artist Private Passions: The World of Edward Linley Sambourne. London: The Royal Borough of Kensington and Chelsea. 2001. ISBN 978-0-9540-4201-1.
