= Photographic Information Council =

20th century photographic industry promotional body in Britain

The Photographic Information Council was a photographic industry promotional body in Britain formed in 1958 and active until the early 1970s.

== History ==
The Photographic Information Council, based in London, was set up in 1958 to represent leading sections of the photographic industry and develop public awareness campaigns to promote photography and photo literacy. First chairman was Norman Thorpe, a founding member being C. G. Strasser.

== Publications ==
It promoted photography, and photographic equipment and supplies, through 'how-to' newspaper articles, and in a series of leaflets written by members, and with organised competitions, with the target audience being novices. Their earliest writers included Michael Geraghty, George Zygmund, and Kenneth G. Pope who produced a series Facts on Photography signing them over to the legend Photographic Information Council.

== Competitions ==
The Photographic Information Council's 1960 National Challenge Trophies Competition for School Photography in England attracted entries from the 200 schools in Britain with active camera clubs. Winners' trophies were presented by the then 30 year-old photographer, Antony Armstrong-Jones, husband of Princess Margaret, at the opening of an exhibition of the work on 7 December in his first solo public engagement.

News of the event was covered in Time magazine, and in American and Australian newspapers as well as in England. Other prominent people were presenters of the winning trophies; Chris Chattaway, MP, Parliamentary Secretary to the Ministry of Education in 1962, and in February 1966, Sir Charles MacLean, Chief Scout of the Commonwealth, when school camera clubs were reported to number 1,300.

== Advocacy ==
The Council advocated for the industry, for example when Australia was the only country where sales tax was imposed on finished photographic products, it assisted in an unsuccessful 1969 High Court challenge to the impost.

By 1972 the council had ceased activities.

== American organisation ==
The name was revived in the 1990s in the United States where the Photo Imaging Manufacturers & Distributors Association (PMDA) established in 1939, with the Photo Marketing Association, created an American 'Photographic Information Council'
