= Peter Farmer (set designer) =

Peter Farmer (3 November 1936 – 1 January 2017) was a British set designer, theatre artist, and book illustrator.

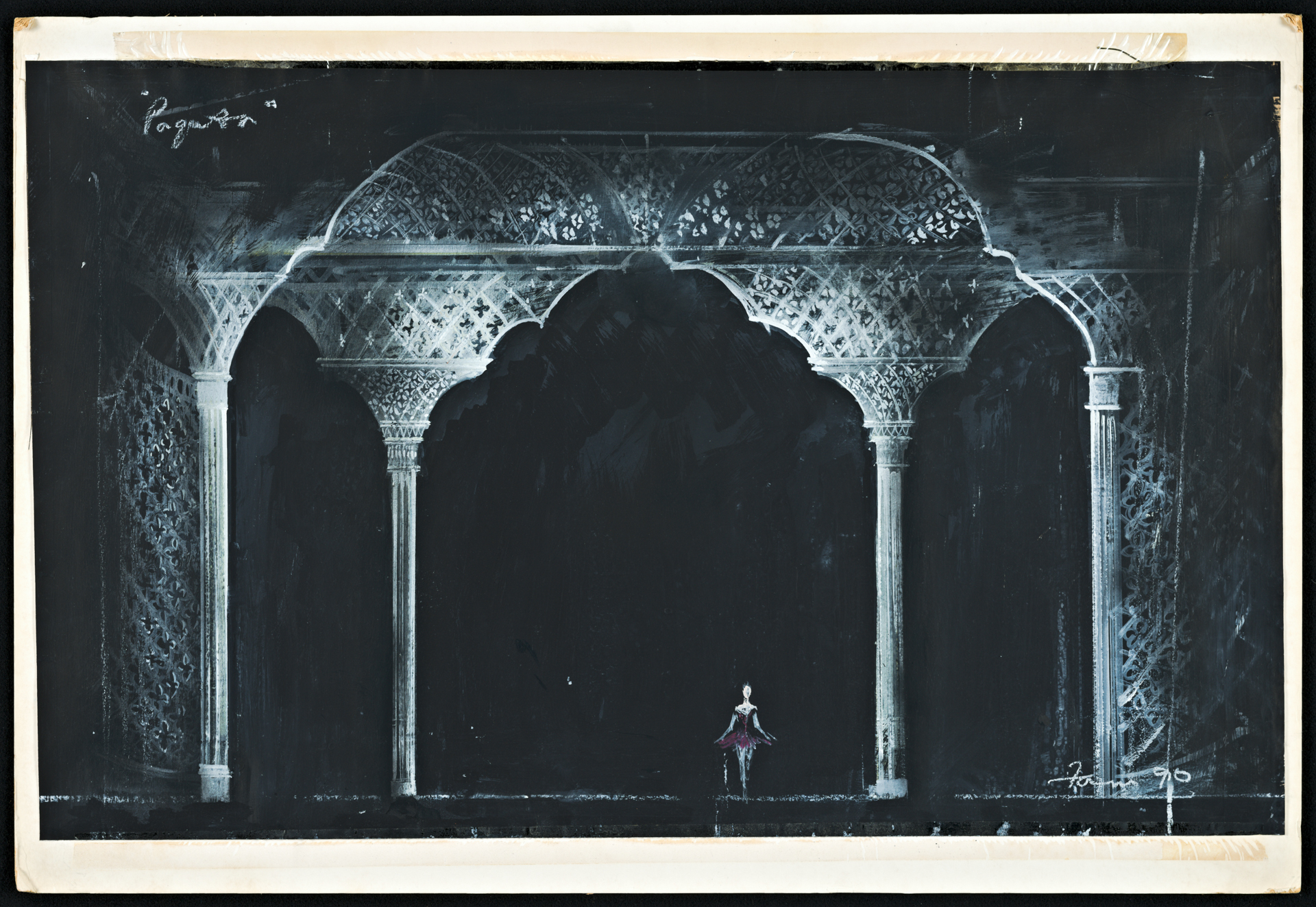
Peter Farmer, set design for "Paquita" by Aloisius Ludwig Minkus. Tempera on paperboard, 1991. Coreography by Marius Petipa restaged by Fernando Bujones, Production by Teatro Regio Torino.

== Biography ==
Born in Luton on 3 November 1936, the son of a hat factory owner, he studied at an art college in Luton and made his professional debut with designs for Jack Carter's Agrionia for London Dance Theatre. Beginning with a production of Giselle for the Stuttgart Ballet in 1966, Farmer worked extensively in ballet, collaborating with the Royal Ballet and Birmingham Royal Ballet, and other major international ballet companies. For the Royal Ballet, he designed productions of Giselle (1971), The Sleeping Beauty (1973), Robert North's The Troy Game (1980) and Kenneth MacMillan's Winter Dreams (1991). For Frederick Ashton's centenary, he was invited to supplement the original designs for Sylvia, and in 2006, he also updated Oliver Messel's legendary 1946 designs for The Sleeping Beauty. After this came Homage to The Queen, a showpiece ballet to celebrate Queen Elizabeth II's 80th birthday. His final credit with The Royal Ballet came the following year, with the company's first production of George Balanchine's Theme and Variations.

His productions for other companies included Ashton's The Dream (Sadler's Wells Ballet, Birmingham Royal Ballet), Cinderella (London Festival Ballet), Swan Lake (English National Ballet, Royal Winnipeg Ballet), The Tales of Hoffmann (Scottish Ballet), The Nutcracker (Rome Opera Ballet, English National Ballet), Anna Karenina, Madame Butterfly and La Bayadère (Australian Ballet), La Sylphide (Rome Opera Ballet, Bolshoi Ballet), Theme and Variations and Coppélia (Birmingham Royal Ballet) and more than a dozen productions of Giselle. His designs for MacMillan's Manon have been used by the Mariinsky Ballet, American Ballet Theatre, Australian Ballet, the National Ballet of Canada and Houston Ballet.

He also designed over a dozen productions for London Contemporary Dance Theatre, including Robert Cohan's Stages in 1971. His productions for the dramatic stage included The Night of the Iguana (1965), Man and Superman (1966) and A Woman of No Importance (1978).

In 2010, he received the Prix Benois de la Danse Lifetime Achievement award.
