= Earl of Snowdon =

Earldom in the Peerage of the United Kingdom

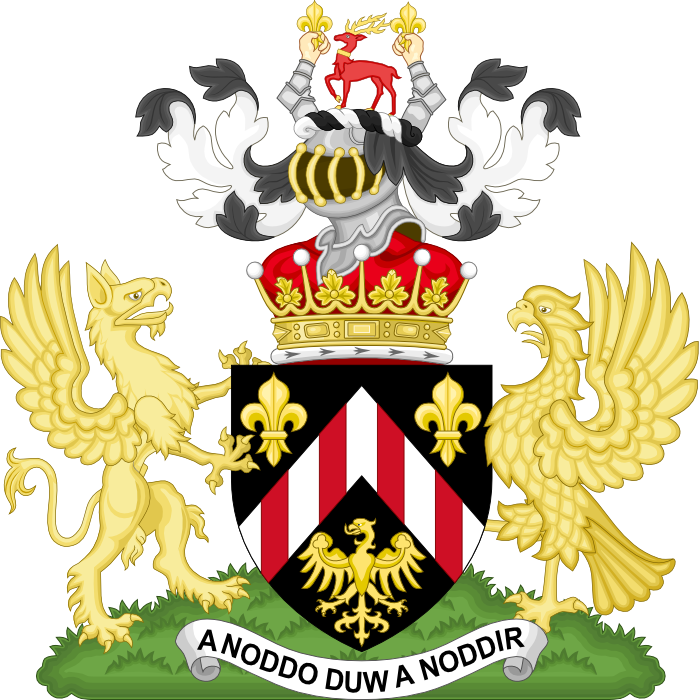
- Blazon Arms of the 1st Earl of Snowdon at the time of the earldom's creation: Sable on a chevron argent, between in chief two fleurs-de-lis Or, and in base an eagle displayed Or, four pallets gules.
- Creation date: 6 October 1961
- Created by: Elizabeth II
- Peerage: United Kingdom
- First holder: Antony Armstrong-Jones, 1st Earl of Snowdon
- Present holder: David Armstrong-Jones, 2nd Earl of Snowdon
- Heir apparent: Charles Armstrong-Jones, Viscount Linley
- Remainder to: the 1st Earl's heirs male of the body lawfully begotten
- Subsidiary titles: Viscount Linley; Baron Armstrong-Jones (1999–2017)

Earl of Snowdon is a title in the Peerage of the United Kingdom. It was created in 1961, together with the subsidiary title of Viscount Linley, of Nymans in the County of Sussex, by Queen Elizabeth II for her then-brother-in-law, Antony Armstrong-Jones, who married Princess Margaret in 1960.

== Titles ==
=== Choice of names ===
Snowdon, chosen for the earldom, had previously been used for a peerage title with royal associations. The title of Baron Snowdon had been conferred in 1726 along with the Dukedom of Edinburgh on Prince Frederick Louis, grandson of George I and future Prince of Wales. It merged with the Crown in 1760, when its holder acceded as George III.

Linley, chosen for the viscountcy, comes from the 1st Earl of Snowdon's maternal great-grandfather, the English cartoonist and illustrator Edward Linley Sambourne.

Nymans, chosen as territorial designation of the viscountcy, relates to an English garden near Handcross in West Sussex, where Anne Armstrong-Jones (née Messel), Countess of Rosse, mother of the 1st Earl of Snowdon, had grown up.

=== Life peerage ===
In November 1999, the 1st Earl of Snowdon received a life peerage as Baron Armstrong-Jones, under a device designed to allow first-generation hereditary peers to retain their seats in the House of Lords, after the passing of the House of Lords Act 1999.

== Earl of Snowdon (1961) ==
- Antony Charles Robert Armstrong-Jones, 1st Earl of Snowdon (1930–2017)
  - David Albert Charles Armstrong-Jones, 2nd Earl of Snowdon (born 1961)
    - (1) Charles Patrick Inigo Armstrong-Jones, Viscount Linley (born 1999)

The heir apparent is the present holder's only son, Charles Armstrong-Jones, Viscount Linley (born 1999).

== Coats of arms ==
Arms of the 1st Earl of Snowdon, GCVO

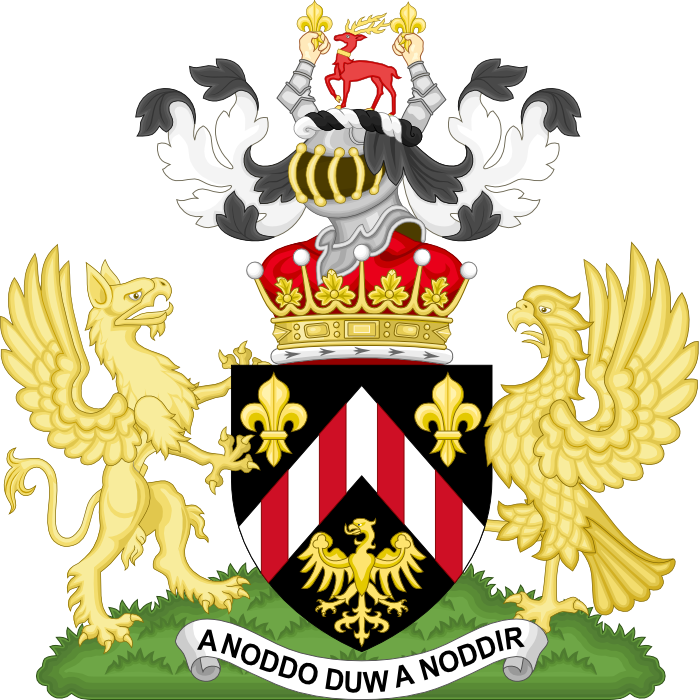
Arms of the 2nd Earl of Snowdon

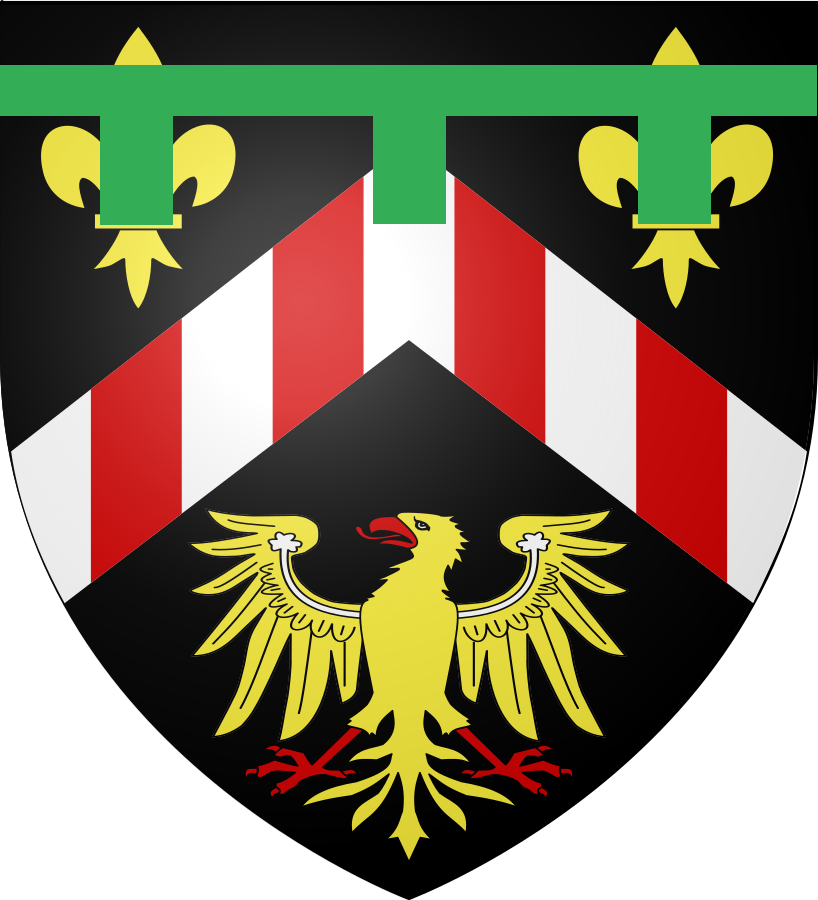
Arms of the 2nd Earl of Snowdon's heir apparent Charles, Viscount Linley
