= Margaret Rhodes =

British aristocrat (1925–2016)

The Honourable Margaret Rhodes LVO
- Margaret Rhodes c. 1950
- Born: Margaret Elphinstone; 9 June 1925; Westminster, London, England
- Died: 25 November 2016 (aged 91); Windsor, Berkshire, England
- Occupation: Woman of the bedchamber
- Employer: Queen Elizabeth the Queen Mother (1991–2002)
- Spouse: Denys Rhodes (m. 1950; died 1981)
- Children: 4
- Parents: Sidney Elphinstone, 16th Lord Elphinstone; Lady Mary Bowes-Lyon
- Relatives: Queen Elizabeth the Queen Mother (maternal aunt); Elizabeth II (first cousin); Princess Margaret, Countess of Snowdon (first cousin)
- Rhodes' voice from the BBC programme Desert Island Discs, 3 June 2012

Margaret Rhodes (née Elphinstone; 9 June 1925 – 25 November 2016) was a British aristocrat, niece of Queen Elizabeth the Queen Mother and first cousin of Queen Elizabeth II and Princess Margaret, Countess of Snowdon. From 1991 to 2002, she served as Woman of the Bedchamber to her aunt, the Queen Mother.

== Early life and education ==
Born The Honourable Margaret Elphinstone in Westminster, London, Rhodes was the youngest daughter of the 16th Lord Elphinstone and his wife, Lady Mary Bowes-Lyon, an elder sister of Queen Elizabeth the Queen Mother. Her uncle-in-law King George VI was her godfather. Less than a year older than her cousin Elizabeth, she was a frequent playmate of the future Queen. During the Second World War she lived at Windsor Castle and Buckingham Palace, and took a secretarial course. On 20 November 1947, she was a bridesmaid to Princess Elizabeth at her wedding to Philip Mountbatten, Duke of Edinburgh.

== Career ==
During World War II, she worked as a secretary for MI6. She was a Woman of the Bedchamber – a mix of lady-in-waiting and companion – to her aunt Queen Elizabeth the Queen Mother, from 1991 until the latter's death in 2002.

In the 2000 Birthday Honours Rhodes was appointed Lieutenant of the Royal Victorian Order (LVO). She lived in the Garden House, a grace and favour residence in Windsor Great Park. In the run-up to the Queen's 80th birthday in April 2006, Rhodes gave an interview to the BBC in which she stated her belief that the Queen would not abdicate.

Her autobiography, The Final Curtsey, was published in 2011. She was the castaway on BBC Radio 4's Desert Island Discs on 3 June 2012.

Rhodes appeared in seven documentaries about her first cousin Queen Elizabeth II.

On 27 November 2016, Buckingham Palace confirmed that Rhodes had died, aged 91, on 25 November following a short illness. The Queen and the Duke of Edinburgh attended her funeral in the Royal Chapel of All Saints, Windsor Great Park, on 12 December 2016, accompanied by the then Duke of York Andrew Mountbatten-Windsor, the Earl and Countess of Wessex, the Duke and Duchess of Gloucester, and Princess Alexandra, The Hon. Lady Ogilvy.

== Personal life ==
On 31 July 1950, she married the writer Denys Gravenor Rhodes (1919–1981), with Princess Margaret as one of the bridesmaids. The couple had four children and one grandson:

- Annabel Margaret Rhodes (born 21 February 1952); she married Christopher James Downing Strickland-Skailes in 1978. They have one son. She remarried G. V. Charles Cope in 1986. Annabel was a goddaughter of the Duke of Edinburgh and served as a bridesmaid at the wedding of Princess Margaret.
  - Andrew James Downing Strickland-Skailes (born 1980)
- Victoria Ann Rhodes (born 27 September 1953), a goddaughter of Queen Elizabeth II; married Nicholas Deans (b. 1950 - d. 1991) in 1974. She got remarried to John Michael Pryor in 1999. She has three children with her first husband.
  - Jesse Deans (1977)
  - Oliver Deans (1980)
  - Sebastian Deans (1982)
- Simon John Gravenor Rhodes (born 22 February 1957), a godson of Princess Margaret; married Susan Simon in 1983. Susan was appointed as an extra lady-in-waiting to Queen Elizabeth II in July 2017, and an Extra Lady-in-Waiting to the Princess Royal in January 2024. They have two children.
  - Emma Rhodes (1985)
  - Camilla Rhodes (1990)
- Michael Andrew Gravenor Rhodes (born 8 June 1960). He is married to Alison Parker and they have one child.
  - Billie Rhodes (1991)
