= Brendan Parsons, 7th Earl of Rosse =

Irish nobleman

The Right Honourable The Earl of Rosse HonFTCD
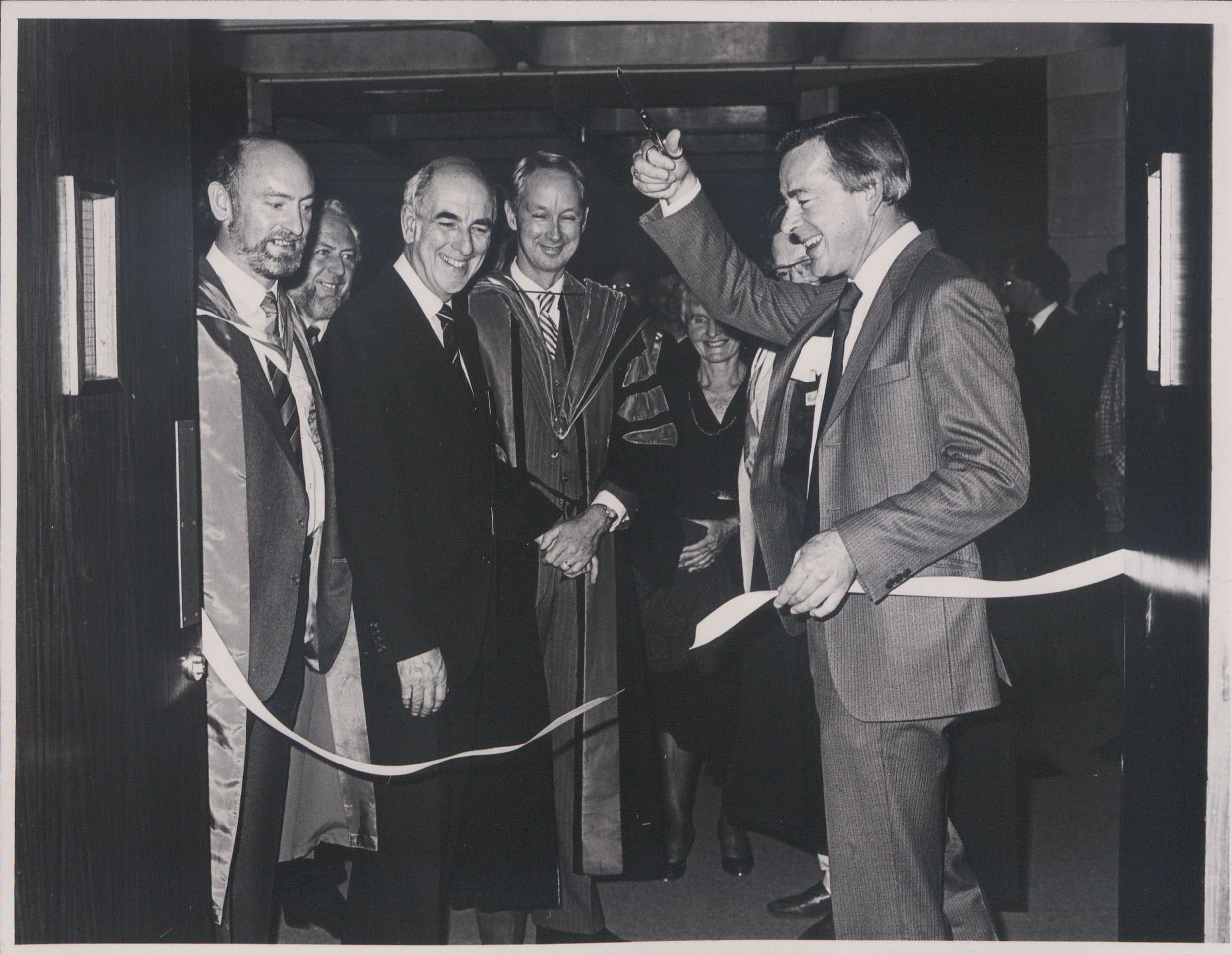
- The 7th Earl of Rosse opens the Sir Charles Parsons Theatre at NIHE (1986)

Personal details
- Born: William Clere Leonard Brendan Parsons; 21 October 1936 (age 89) London, England
- Spouse: Alison Margaret Cooke-Hurle (m. 1966)
- Children: 3
- Parents: Michael Parsons, 6th Earl of Rosse; Anne Messel, Countess of Rosse
- Education: Eton College; Aiglon College; Christ Church, Oxford; University of Grenoble

William Clere Leonard Brendan Parsons, 7th Earl of Rosse HonFTCD (often known simply as Brendan Rosse; born 21 October 1936), is an Anglo-Irish peer. He is also 10th Baronet Parsons, of Birr Castle.

== Biography ==
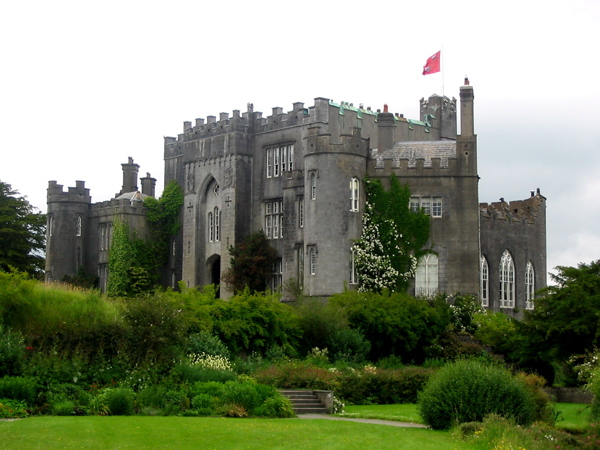
Birr Castle, County Offaly, seat of the Earls of Rosse

Lord Rosse was the eldest son of Laurence Michael Harvey Parsons, 6th Earl of Rosse, and Anne (née Messel, mother of Antony Armstrong-Jones, 1st Earl of Snowdon by an earlier marriage). Lord Rosse was educated at Eton College, Aiglon College, University of Grenoble and Christ Church, Oxford. He was an officer in the Irish Guards from 1955–57 and worked for the United Nations from 1963–80. He succeeded his father in 1979. He lives at Birr Castle, County Offaly. From his birth until he succeeded to the earldom in 1979, he was known as Lord Oxmantown.

From 1979 to 2007, Lord and Lady Rosse facilitated many decades of research by A. P. W. Malcomson, former director of the Public Record Office of Northern Ireland, and latterly sponsored by the Irish Manuscripts Commission, to enable the production, for the first time, of a comprehensive Calendar of the Rosse Papers in 2008. The archive is held in the Muniment Room of Birr Castle. The Calendar is of great value to researchers delving into the history of the Parsons family, the English settlement of the Irish midlands in the 17th century, the Williamite wars, early Irish nationalism, the Royal Navy in the eighteenth century, nineteenth-century science and astronomy, and the fate of the Irish landed gentry in the early twentieth century.

Lord Rosse appeared in Great British Railway Journeys, Antiques Road Trip and in an episode of Lords & Ladies that focused on Birr Castle. His wife, Alison, Countess of Rosse, and his children Lady Alicia Clements and Michael Parsons, also appeared in this programme.

He was awarded an Honorary Doctorate in Law by Trinity College in 2005 and in 2014 he was elected an honorary fellow of Trinity College Dublin.

== Marriage and children ==
He married Alison Margaret Cooke-Hurle, daughter of Major John Davey Cooke-Hurle and Margaret Louisa Watson, on 15 October 1966. They have three children:

- Lawrence Patrick Parsons, Lord Oxmantown (b. 31 March 1969); married Anna Lin Xiaojing in 2004 and has two children, Hon. Olivia and Hon. William.
- Lady Alicia Parsons (b. 1971), a goddaughter of Princess Margaret; married Nathaniel Clements in 2007.
- The Hon. Michael Parsons (b. 9 November 1981)

== Sources ==
- Malcomson, A.P.W. (editor), Calendar of the Rosse Papers (2008). Dublin: Irish Manuscripts Commission; ISBN 978-1-874280-69-9

Peerage of Ireland
Preceded by Michael Parsons	Earl of Rosse; 1979 – present	Incumbent; Heir: Lawrence Parsons
