= Denys Rhodes =

English writer

- Born: Denys Gravenor Rhodes; 9 July 1919; Ireland
- Died: 30 October 1981 (aged 62)
- Occupation: Writer
- Spouses: Rachel Gurney (m. 1946; ann. 1950) Hon. Margaret Elphinstone (m. 1950)
- Children: 5
- Parent(s): Arthur Tahu Gravenor Rhodes; Hon. Helen Cecil Olive Plunket
- Relatives: Arthur Rhodes (paternal grandfather); William Plunket, 5th Baron Plunket (maternal grandfather); William Barnard Rhodes (granduncle)

Denys Gravenor Rhodes (9 July 1919 – 30 October 1981) was an English writer. He was best known for his novel The Syndicate, which was adapted into a 1968 film.

== Early life and background ==
Rhodes was born in Ireland, the son of (Arthur) Tahu Gravenor Rhodes, MVO (d. 1947), a solicitor and Captain in the Grenadier Guards, by his wife, Hon. Helen Cecil Olive Plunket, eldest daughter of the 5th Lord Plunket, Governor of New Zealand from 1904 to 1910. His paternal grandfather was the New Zealand politician Arthur Edgar Gravenor Rhodes OBE and his granduncle was the politician and pastoralist William Barnard Rhodes. Rhodes served in the Second World War with the Rifle Brigade, fighting in North Africa and Italy.

== Personal life ==
He was married twice. His first marriage was to actress Rachel Gurney in 1946. The couple had a daughter, Sharon Gurney. The marriage was annulled in 1950. His second marriage was on 31 July 1950 to The Honourable Margaret Elphinstone (1925–2016), a first cousin of Elizabeth II. Princess Margaret served as a bridesmaid. The couple had four children and one grandson:

- Annabel Margaret Rhodes (born 21 February 1952); served as a bridesmaid to Princess Margaret in 1960. She married Christopher James Downing Strickland-Skailes in 1978. They have one son. She remarried G. V. Charles Cope in 1986.
  - Andrew James Downing Strickland-Skailes (born 1980)
- Victoria Ann Rhodes (born 27 September 1953), a goddaughter of Queen Elizabeth II; married Nicholas Deans in 1974.
- Simon John Gravenor Rhodes (born 22 February 1957), a godson of Princess Margaret; married Susan Simon in 1983, who was appointed as an extra lady-in-waiting to Queen Elizabeth II in July 2017.
- Michael Andrew Gravenor Rhodes (born 8 June 1960)

After his second marriage, Rhodes lived and wrote at Uplowman House at Uplowman in Devon, until inoperable lung cancer led to a move nearer London. They were offered The Garden House in Windsor Great Park by the Queen, where his wife continued to live until her own death in 2016, and where she wrote her 2011 memoir, The Final Curtsey.

== Sources ==
- Denys Rhodes at IMDb
