= Edward Linley Sambourne =

British cartoonist (1844–1910)

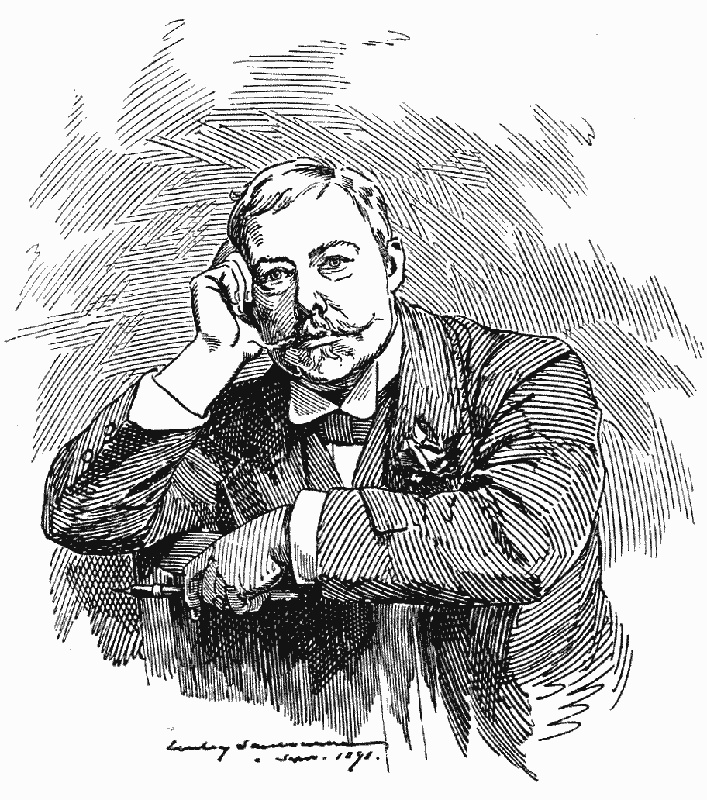
1891 self-portrait

Edward Linley Sambourne (4 January 1844 – 3 August 1910) was an English cartoonist and illustrator most famous for being a draughtsman for the satirical magazine Punch for more than forty years and rising to the position of "First Cartoonist" in his final decade.

== Early life and education ==
Edward Linley Sambourne was born in the family home at 15 Lloyd Square in Pentonville, London 4 January 1844. He was the only surviving child of Edward Mott Sambourne, a furrier merchant in the City of London. His mother Frances Linley was the daughter of Peter Linley, who followed into the family business of scythe manufacture near Sheffield.

Linley was educated at various schools throughout England. Aged 10 or 11 he enrolled as a pupil in the City of London School, but by 1857 he was at a school in Sheffield. From late 1857 to 1860 he was enrolled in a new school, the Chester Training College, where he was encouraged to pursue his talent for drawing. In 1860, aged 16, Linley enrolled in the South Kensington School of Art, but stayed only a couple of months.

== Punch ==
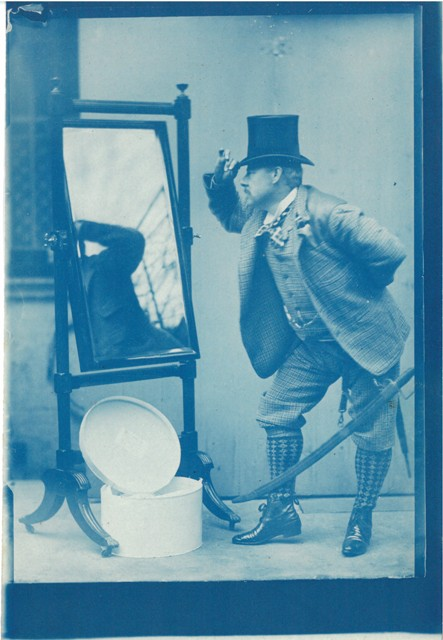
Self portrait of Linley Sambourne modelling (10 January 1895) for Punch cartoon "Quite English, You Know!"

In 1861 Sambourne was apprenticed to John Penn and Sons, marine engineers of Greenwich. Initially he worked under the founder's son, John Penn Jr, but was moved to the drawing office when his employer discovered his aptitude for draft drawing. In his spare time Sambourne continued to draw caricatures and study the great graphic artists such as William Hogarth and Albrecht Dürer. One version Sambourne recounts about the events leading to his introduction to Punch's editor Mark Lemon is that his friend and fellow employee at Penn's, Alfred German Reed, showed one of his sketches to his father, the theatrical impresario Thomas German Reed. At his son's urging Thomas to pass the drawing on to Mark Lemon. Lemon was sufficiently impressed by the sketch that he encouraged Sambourne to take art lessons and consult the engraver Joseph Swain about drawing on wood. Pleased with the results, Lemon published a drawing by Sambourne in the 27 April 1867 issue of Punch. This was an initial letter 'T' showing the politician John Bright striking a quintain.

Initially employed on a casual basis by Lemon, Sambourne was asked to supply the decorated initial letters that stood at head of articles, stories and poems incorporating the first letter into a fanciful design. Between 1867 and 1874 Sambourne contributed 350 initial letters. Although Sambourne's distinctive style emerged only slowly, he became a regular staff member of Punch in 1871. At the beginning he made his name by his "social" drawings while continuing to provide his highly elaborated initial letters. He drew his first political cartoon, properly so-called, in 1884, and ten years later began regularly to design the weekly second cartoon. At the end of John Tenniel's long occupancy in 1901, he became the magazine's chief principal cartoonist.

Unusually for an artist working in black and white, Sambourne used a huge library of photographic images to give accuracy to his work, which was characterized by a vivid and decisive linearity as well as an artistic inventiveness that took his images far beyond the simple concept of a cartoon or "comic cut". The quality of his work for Punch was acknowledged by the Royal Academy, which exhibited his drawings over a 20-year period.

== Other works ==
While his work for Punch occupied most of his energy, it was not Sambourne's only source of income, as he would often accept commissions for individuals, books, magazines and advertisements. These include:

=== Book illustrations ===
- Military Men I have met ..., Edward Dyne Fenton, 1872
- Our Autumn Holiday on French Rivers ..., James Lynam Molly, 1874
- Our Holiday in the Scottish Highlands, Arthur à Beckett, 1876
- The Royal Umbrella. [A tale.] ..., Alfred Frederick Pollock Harcourt, 1879
- The Modern Arabian Nights, Arthur a' Beckett, 1877
- Poems of Edgar Allan Poe, 1881
- The Water Babies, Charles Kingsley, 1885
- Sherryana, F. W. Cosens, 1886
- Friends and Foes from Fairy Land, Edward Knatchbull-Hugessen, 1886
- The Green Above The Red: More Blarney Ballads, Charles L. Graves, 1889
- The Real Adventures of Robinson Crusoe, F. C. Burnand, 1893

=== Diploma ===
- International Fisheries Exhibition Diploma, 1883–84, referred to by the Encyclopædia Britannica Eleventh Edition, as "of its kind one of the most extraordinary things in English art".

=== Invitations ===
- Invitation to the Lord Mayor's Banquet, 1888

=== Advertisements ===
- Apenta aperient water
- Philip Morris cigarettes, 1889
- Rose's lime juice
- Mazawatte tea
- Lancashire Railway

=== Covers ===
- The Naval and Military Gazette
- The Pall Mall Gazette
- The Sketch
- The Sphere

=== Illustrations ===
- Black and White, 1891
- The British Workman
- The Illustrated London News
- The Piccadilly Magazine
- The Pictorial World

== Examples of his work ==
Examples from his series of caricatures in Punch 1881–82, "Punch's Fancy Portraits":

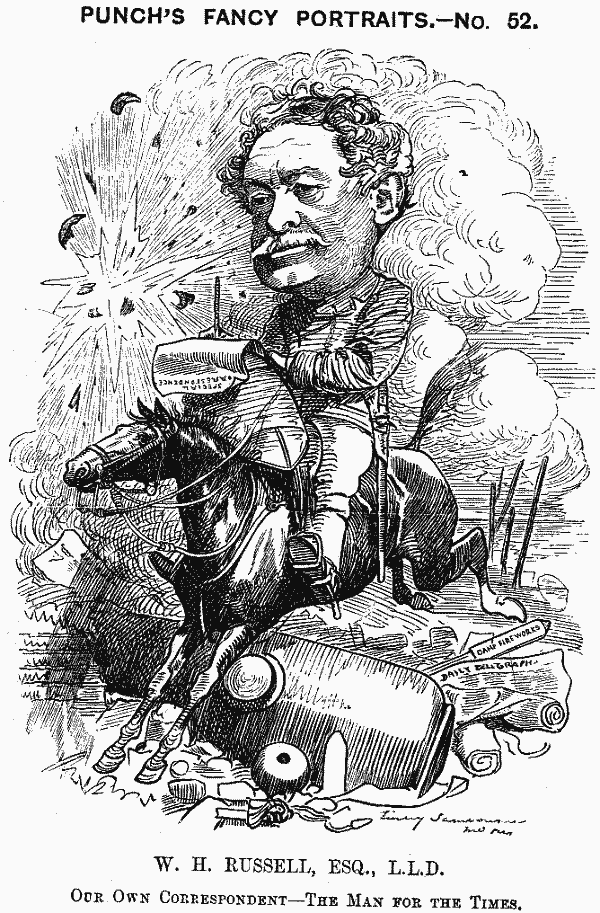
William Howard Russell

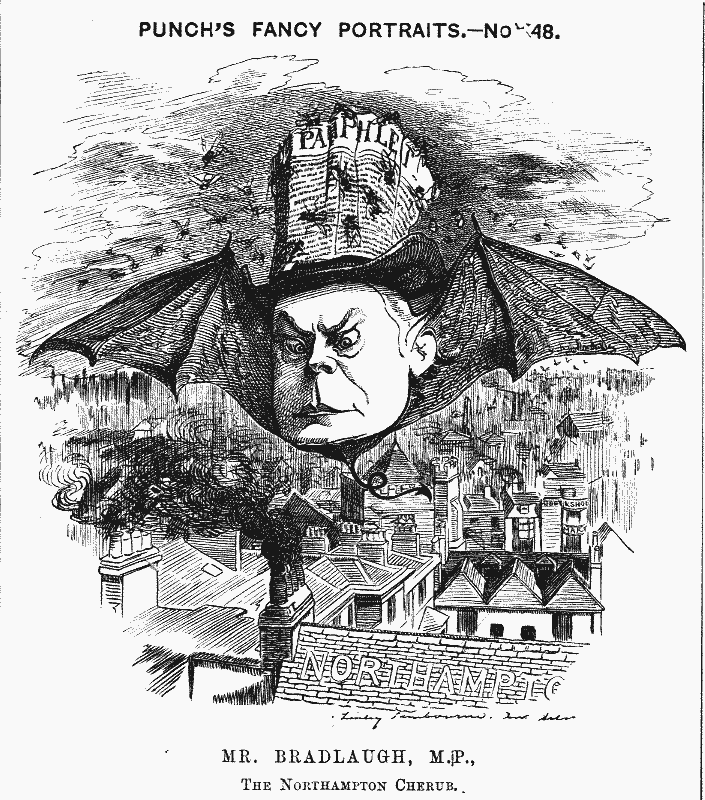
Charles Bradlaugh

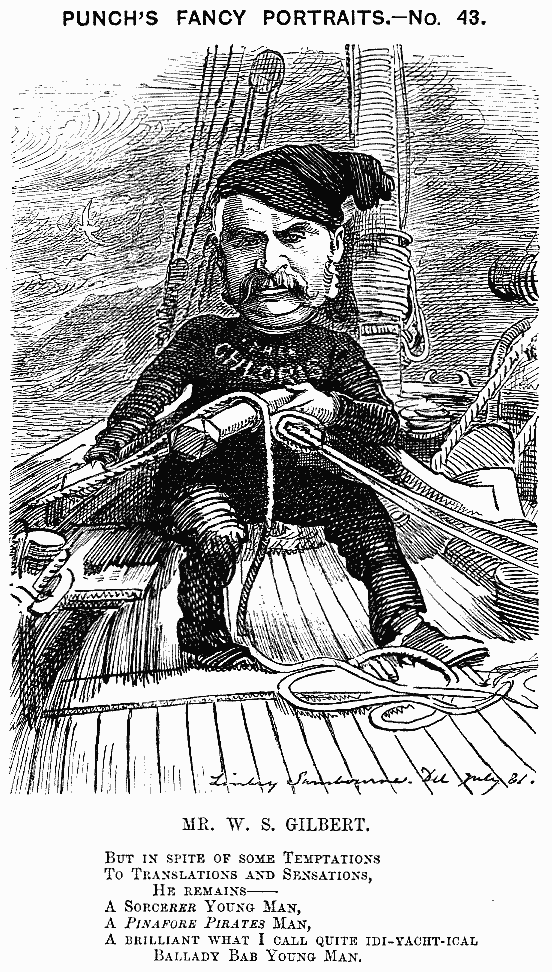
W. S. Gilbert

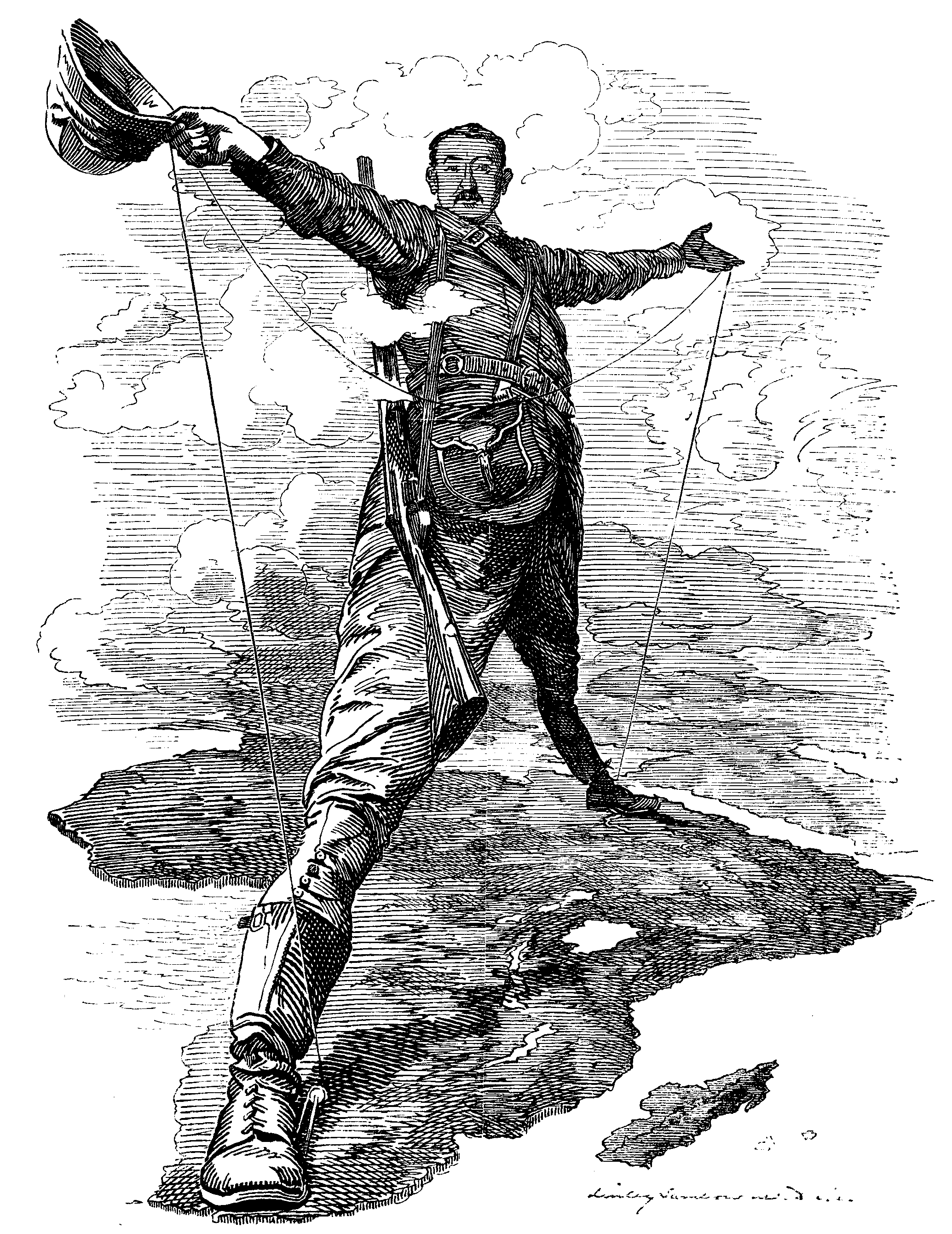
The Rhodes Colossus

More of Sambourne's caricatures from this series can be seen in the articles for William Harrison Ainsworth, Emma Albani, Matthew Arnold, Lord Charles Beresford, William Black, George Granville Bradley, Robert Browning, Hugh Childers, Lord Randolph Churchill, Henry Drummond Wolff, Henry Fawcett, James Anthony Froude, George Joachim Goschen, John Holker, Henry Labouchère, Henry Parry Liddon, John Lubbock, 1st Baron Avebury, Henry Edward Manning, Oscar Wilde, Ouida, James Payn, George Augustus Henry Sala, Eyre Massey Shaw, Arthur Sullivan, William James Erasmus Wilson, and Garnet Wolseley, 1st Viscount Wolseley.

See also: Phylloxera, Cecil Rhodes.

== Descendants ==
Edward Linley Sambourne married Mary Ann (Marion) Herapath (1851–1914) in 1874. She was the eldest daughter of the nine children of Spencer Herapath, a successful stockbroker, and his wife Mary Ann Walker. The couple had two children: Maud (born 1875) and Mawdley, also known as Roy (born 1878).

Mawdley (Roy) Herapath Sambourne (1878–1946) did not marry. In 1898 his sister Maud Frances Sambourne (1875–1960) married Leonard Messel, a young stockbroker and collector. They had three children: Linley (born 1899), Anne born 1902 (first married to Major Ronald Armstrong-Jones, later to Michael Parsons, 6th Earl of Rosse), and Oliver Messel (an acclaimed set designer and architect) born 1904.

Further descendants of Edward Linley Sambourne include: his great-grandson Antony Armstrong-Jones, 1st Earl of Snowdon (the photographer and documentary filmmaker), and great-great-grandson David Armstrong-Jones, 2nd Earl of Snowdon (the furniture designer and chairman of Christie's auction house).

Due to the number of photographs taken of himself posing as a model for drawings, Boston-based journalist Susan Clare Zalkind has suggested that her great-great-great-grandfather, Sambourne, is the "grandfather of the selfie."

== See also ==
- Linley Sambourne House
