= Nymans =

Grade II* garden in West Sussex, England

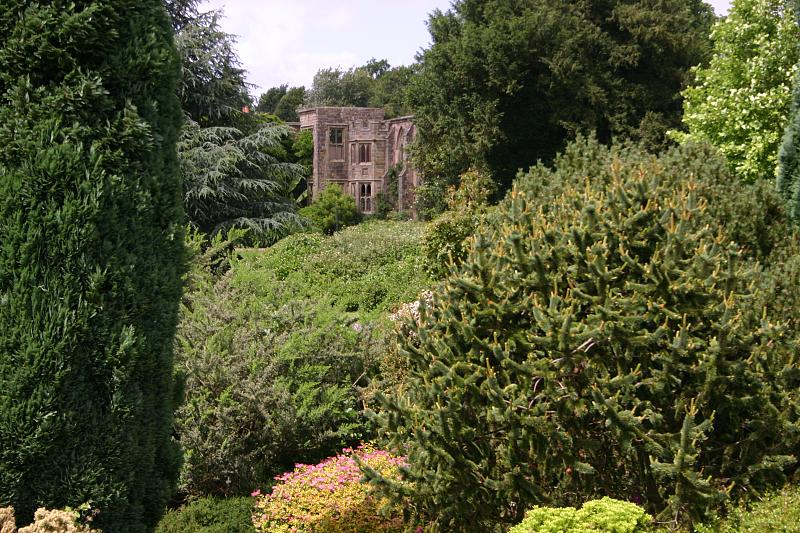
- Marginally hardy exotics thrive in Nymans' sheltered microclimate

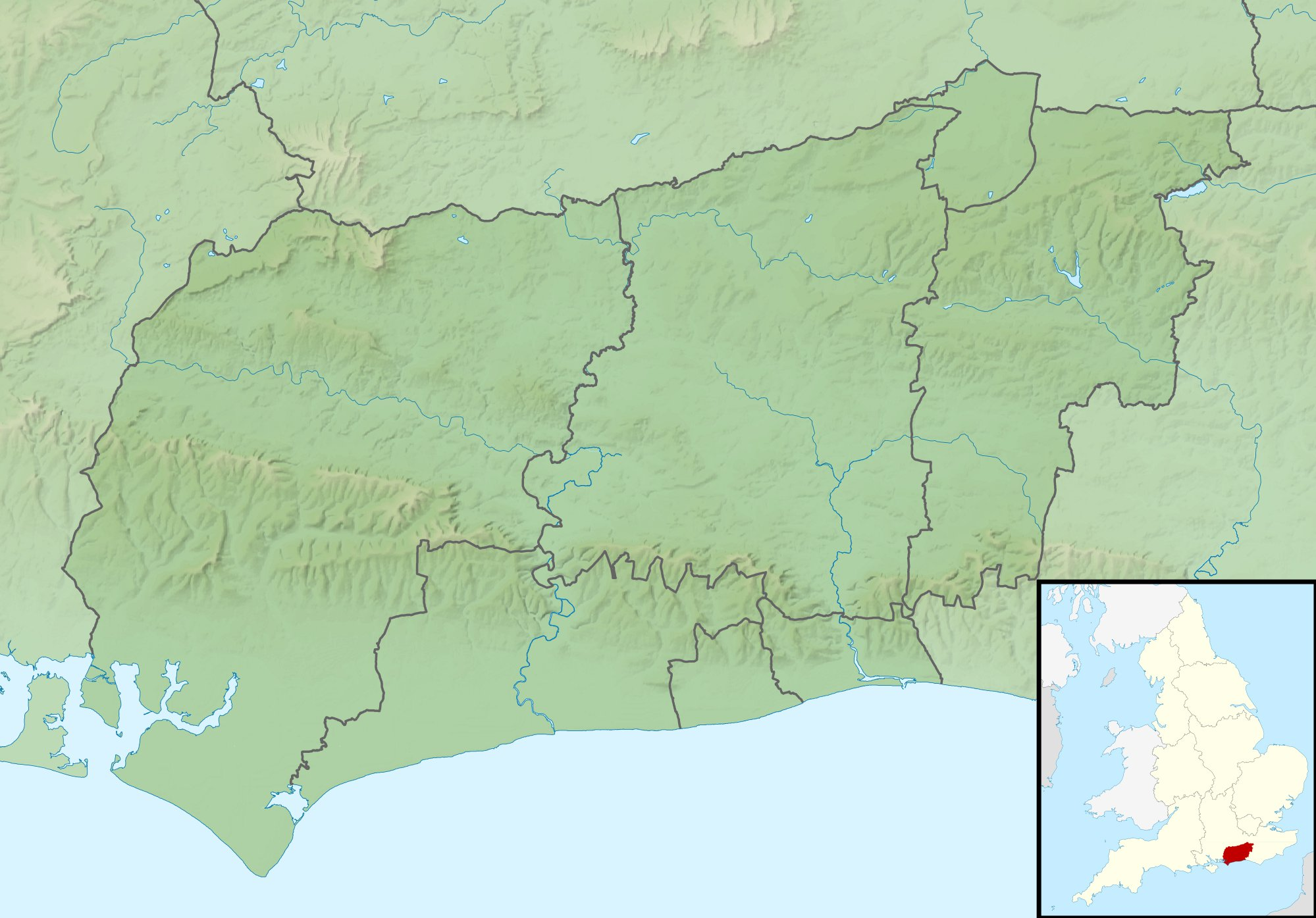
- Location within West Sussex
- Location: Slaugham, West Sussex
- Coordinates: 51°03′00″N 0°11′49″W
- Area: 243 hectares (600 acres)
- Created: 1890
- Operator: National Trust
- Visitors: 415,569 (in 2025)
- Designation: Gardens: Grade II* listed; House: Grade II

Nymans is an English garden to the south of the village of Handcross, and in the civil parish of Slaugham in West Sussex, England. The garden was developed, starting in the late nineteenth century, by three generations of the Messel family, and was brought to renown by Leonard Messel.

In 1953 Nymans became a National Trust property. Nymans is the origin of many sports, selections and hybrids, both planned and serendipitous, some of which can be identified by the term nymansensis, "of Nymans". Eucryphia × nymansensis (E. cordifolia × E. glutinosa) is also known as E. "Nymansay". Magnolia × loebneri 'Leonard Messel', Camellia 'Maud Messel' and Forsythia suspensa 'Nymans', with its bronze young stems, are all familiar shrubs to gardeners.

The gardens are listed Grade II* in Historic England's Register of Parks and Gardens, and the house is a Grade II listed building. During 2025, the gardens received 415,569 visitors.

== History ==
In the late nineteenth century, Ludwig Ernest Wilhelm Leonard Messel (1847–1915), a member of a German Jewish banking family, settled in England and bought the Nymans estate, a house with 243 hectares (600 acres) on a sloping site overlooking the picturesque High Weald of Sussex. There he set about turning the estate into a place for family life and entertainment, with an Arts and Crafts-inspired garden room where topiary features contrast with new plants from temperate zones around the world.

After buying the property in 1890, Messel set about transforming the original Regency house into a German-style structure. Ludwig's brother Alfred Messel, already a well-known architect in Germany, drew up the plans; construction work was carried out by local builders.

Messel's head gardener from 1895 was James Comber, whose expertise helped form plant collections at Nymans of camellias, rhododendrons, which unusually at the time were combined with planting heather (Erica) eucryphias and magnolias. William Robinson advised in establishing the Wild Garden.

Messel, who was of Jewish ancestry and of German extraction, was harassed during the First World War. Unsubstantiated rumours abounded that he used the tower at Nymans for the purposes of espionage.

Ludwig's son Colonel Leonard Messel succeeded to the property in 1915 and, at the request of his wife Maud, replaced the German-style wood-beam house with a picturesque mock-medieval stone manor, designed by Sir Walter Tapper and Norman Evill in a mellow late Gothic/Tudor style. He and Maud (daughter of Edward Linley Sambourne) extended the garden to the north and subscribed to seed collecting expeditions in the Himalayas and South America.

The garden reached a peak in the 1930s and was regularly opened to the public. The severe reduction of staff in World War II was followed in 1947 by a disastrous fire in the house, which survives as a garden ruin. The house was partially rebuilt and became the home of Leonard Messel's daughter, Anne Messel, and her second husband Michael Parsons, 6th Earl of Rosse. At Leonard Messel's death in 1953 it was bequeathed to the National Trust with 111 hectares (275 acres) of woodland, one of the first gardens taken on by the Trust. Lady Rosse continued to be garden director.

The garden suffered much damage in the Great Storm of 1987, losing 486 mature trees and many of the shrubs. The pinetum, one of the garden's earliest features, was destroyed.

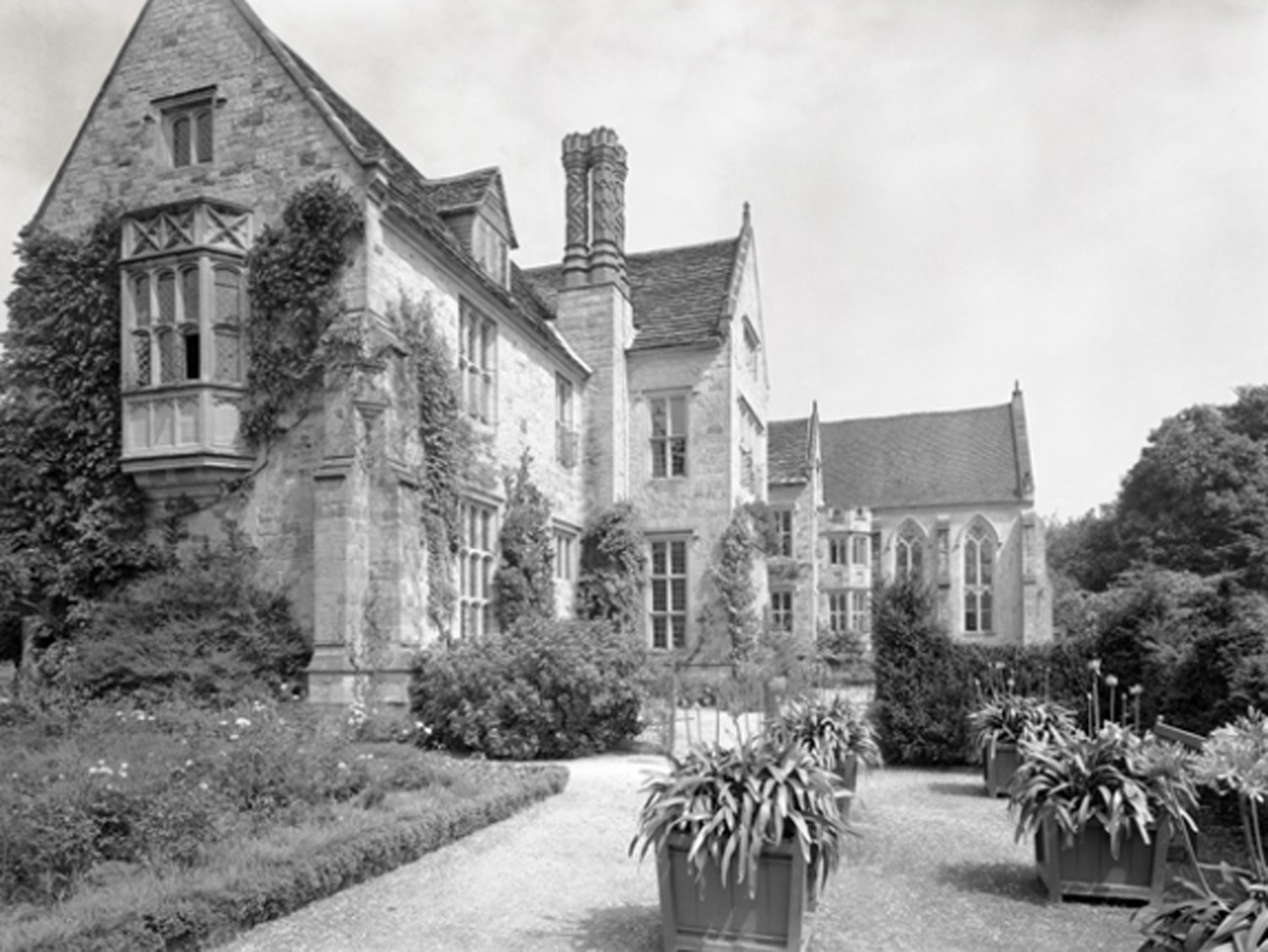
The southern frontage of Nymans in 1932 before the fire and subsequent ruin

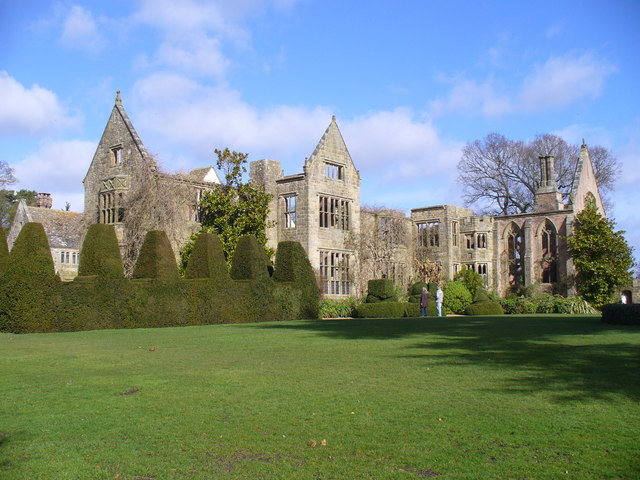
The southern frontage today. The ruined house remains a garden feature.

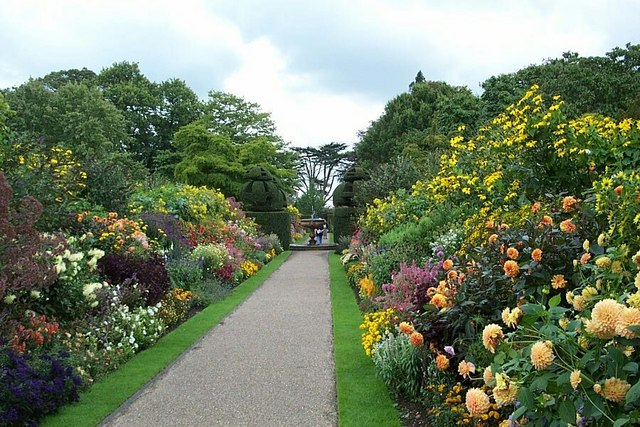
Mixed borders of perennials and annuals in midsummer
