= Anne Parsons, Countess of Rosse =

British socialite

The Right Honourable The Countess of Rosse
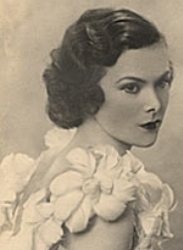
- Born: Anne Messel; 8 February 1902; Gloucester Terrace, Paddington, London, England
- Died: 3 July 1992 (aged 90); Nymans, Sussex, England
- Known for: Founder of The Victorian Society
- Spouses: Ronald Armstrong-Jones (m. 1925; div. 1934) Michael Parsons, 6th Earl of Rosse (m. 1935; died 1979)
- Children: Susan Vesey, Viscountess de Vesci; Antony Armstrong-Jones, 1st Earl of Snowdon; Brendan Parsons, 7th Earl of Rosse; The Hon. Martin Parsons
- Mother: Maud Messel
- Relatives: Edward Linley Sambourne (grandfather); Oliver Messel (brother); David Armstrong-Jones, 2nd Earl of Snowdon (grandson); Lady Sarah Chatto (granddaughter)

Anne Parsons, Countess of Rosse (née Messel, previously Armstrong-Jones; 8 February 1902 – 3 July 1992), was an English socialite and one of the founders of The Victorian Society. She was the mother of Antony Armstrong-Jones, 1st Earl of Snowdon and Brendan Parsons, 7th Earl of Rosse.

== Early life ==
Anne Messel was born 8 February 1902, at 27, Gloucester Terrace, Paddington, London, England, the second child and only daughter of Leonard Charles Rudolph Messel (1872–1953), OBE, TD, a stockbroker and Lieutenant Colonel of the Royal East Kent Regiment, and Maud Messel, daughter of Edward Linley Sambourne. The Messel family was of German-Jewish background; Leonard Messel's father, Ludwig, who had established a successful stockbroking business, had purchased the Nymans estate in West Sussex in the late nineteenth century. Messel was the sister of Linley Messel (1899–1971) and the stage set designer Oliver Messel (1904–1978). She was raised in Sussex, close to her paternal grandparents, who lived at Nymans, and was educated at home. Needlework and gardening were among her early interests. The presence of illustrations in surviving family letters and diaries reveals that she also had some artistic talent.

== Career ==
Anne made her debut in society in 1922. Her poise and fashion sense were praised by society columnists in newspapers such as the Daily Express and Evening News. Her friends included Edward James and Tilly Losch, Zita Jungman, and society photographer Cecil Beaton.

At a Guy Fawkes night party in 1957, inspired by her house at 18 Stafford Terrace and the reaction of its 32 visitors, Anne, Countess of Rosse proposed founding a Victorian Society to encourage the preservation and appreciation of what was then unfashionable art and architecture. A handful of enthusiasts, including Sir John Betjeman and Sir Nikolaus Pevsner, agreed to support the cause. The Victorian Society was founded at 18 Stafford Terrace in February 1958 with the aim of preserving Victorian and Edwardian architecture and encouraging research into the art and history of the period.

== Personal life ==
She married Ronald Armstrong-Jones on 22 July 1925 and they were divorced in early 1935. They had two children:

- Susan Anne Armstrong-Jones (12 February 1927 – 9 May 1986), who married John Vesey, 6th Viscount de Vesci in 1950.
- Antony Armstrong-Jones, 1st Earl of Snowdon (7 March 1930 – 13 January 2017), who married Princess Margaret in 1960.

Anne's father Leonard Messel gifted the couple the long-lease of a London townhouse at No. 25 Eaton Terrace in Belgravia as a wedding present, where both of the couple's children were born.

Anne married Michael Parsons, 6th Earl of Rosse, on 19 September 1935. Rosse had extensive estates in Ireland and was nicknamed "The Adonis of the Peerage". They had two sons and five grandchildren:

- Brendan Parsons, 7th Earl of Rosse (born 21 October 1936), who married Alison Cooke-Hurle on 15 October 1966
- Hon. Desmond Oliver Martin Parsons (23 December 1938 – 16 July 2010), who married Aline Edwina Macdonald

Anne was present at the coronations of both King George VI and Queen Elizabeth II.

=== Nymans ===
In 1947, the house at Nymans was badly damaged by fire, and the countess travelled to Staplefield to help. Her parents vacated the house and bought Holmsted Manor nearby as their new home. The earl and countess continued to use the house, following repairs, and it passed to the National Trust on her father's death in 1953. After the Earl's death in 1979, the countess returned to live at Nymans and retained some responsibility for the appearance of the gardens.

== Sources ==
- De La Haye, Amy; Taylor, Lou; Thompson, Eleanor (2005). A Family of Fashion: The Messels: Six Generations of Dress. Philip Wilson Publishers Ltd. ISBN 0856676101.
- Robbins, Daniel; Suleman, Reena; Hunter, Pamela (2003). Linley Sambourne House: 18 Stafford Terrace, Kensington. The Royal Borough of Kensington and Chelsea. ISBN 0-902242-20-2.
- Anne Parsons (née Messel), Countess of Rosse, National Portrait Gallery.org.uk. Accessed 9 December 2022.
