= Michael Parsons, 6th Earl of Rosse =

Irish peer

The Right Honourable The Earl of Rosse
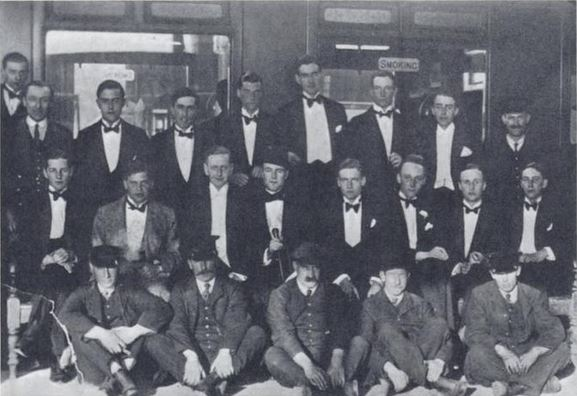
- Railway Club at Oxford, conceived by John Sutro, dominated by Harold Acton. Left to right, back: Henry Yorke, Roy Harrod, Henry Weymouth, David Plunket Greene, Harry Stavordale, Brian Howard. Middle row: Michael Rosse, John Sutro, Hugh Lygon, Harold Acton, Bryan Guinness, Patrick Balfour, Mark Ogilvie-Grant, Johnny Drury-Lowe; front: porters.

Personal details
- Born: 28 September 1906
- Died: 5 July 1979 (aged 72)
- Spouse: Anne Armstrong-Jones (m. 1935)
- Children: Brendan Parsons, 7th Earl of Rosse; Hon. Martin Parsons
- Parent(s): William Edward Parsons, 5th Earl of Rosse; Frances Lois Lister-Kaye
- Education: Eton College; Christ Church, Oxford

Laurence Michael Harvey Parsons, 6th Earl of Rosse, KBE (28 September 1906 – 5 July 1979) was an Anglo-Irish peer. He was known as Lord Oxmantown from 1908 until 1918.

== Early life and education ==
Parsons was the son of William Edward Parsons, 5th Earl of Rosse, whom he succeeded in 1918, and Frances Lois Lister-Kaye, daughter of Sir Cecil Edmund Lister-Kaye, 4th Bt. and Lady Beatrice Adeline Pelham-Clinton.

Lord Rosse was educated at Eton College and Christ Church, Oxford (B.A., 1929; M.A. 1931). At Oxford, Parsons was member of the Railway Club, which included: Henry Yorke, Roy Harrod, Henry Thynne, 6th Marquess of Bath, David Plunket Greene, Edward Henry Charles James Fox-Strangways, 7th Earl of Ilchester, Brian Howard, Michael Parsons, John Sutro, Hugh Lygon, Harold Acton, Bryan Guinness, 2nd Baron Moyne, Patrick Balfour, 3rd Baron Kinross, Mark Ogilvie-Grant, John Drury-Lowe. The members of the Railway Club dined in black-tie aboard the Penzance-Aberdeen Express between Oxford and Leicester.

== Career ==
Lord Rosse fought in the Second World War, reaching the rank of captain in the Irish Guards. He was appointed Member, Order of the British Empire (M.B.E.) in 1945. Lord Rosse held the office of Vice-Chancellor of the University of Dublin between 1949 and 1964 and was Pro-Chancellor of the university from 1965 to 1979.

== Recognition ==
He was elected a Fellow of Royal Society of Arts (F.R.S.A.), a Fellow of the Society of Antiquaries (F.S.A.), and a Fellow of the Royal Astronomical Society (F.R.A.S). He was appointed Knight Commander of the Order of the British Empire (K.B.E.) in the 1974 New Year Honours. Lord Rosse was active in the National Trust.

== Marriage and children ==
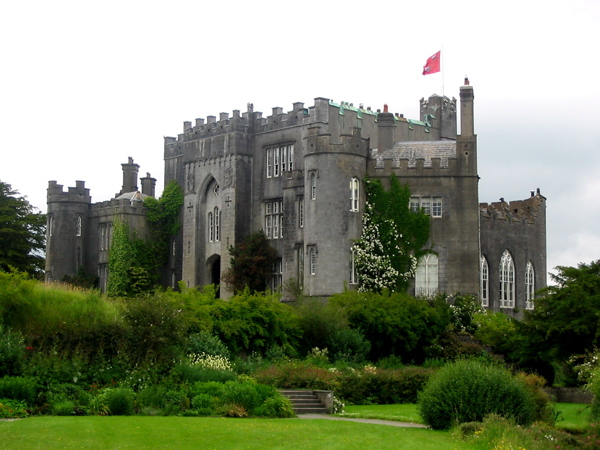
Birr Castle, County Offaly. Seat of the Earls of Rosse

Rosse married Anne Messel, daughter of Lieutenant-Colonel Leonard Charles Rudolph Messel and Maud Frances Sambourne, on 19 September 1935. They spent their honeymoon in China. They had two children:

- Brendan Parsons, 7th Earl of Rosse (born 21 October 1936), married Alison Margaret Cooke-Hurle, daughter of Major John Davey Cooke-Hurle and had issue.
- Hon. Desmond Oliver Martin Parsons (23 December 1938 – 16 July 2010), married Aline Edwina Macdonald, daughter of George Alexander Macdonald and had issue.

Anne Messel, by her first marriage to Ronald Armstrong-Jones, was the mother of Antony Armstrong-Jones, 1st Earl of Snowdon, who in 1960 married Princess Margaret, sister of Queen Elizabeth II of the United Kingdom.

== Notes ==
Peerage of Ireland
| Preceded by William Parsons | Earl of Rosse; 1918–1979 | Succeeded by Brendan Parsons |
