= Ronald Armstrong-Jones =

Welsh barrister and soldier (1899–1966)

Major Ronald Armstrong-Jones MBE QC DL
- Armstrong-Jones in 1954

Personal details
- Born: Ronald Owen Lloyd Armstrong Jones; 18 May 1899 Ilford, Essex, England
- Died: 27 January 1966 (aged 66) Plas Dinas, Caernarfon, Gwynedd, Wales
- Spouses: Anne Messel (m. 1925; div. 1934) Carol Akhurst (m. 1936; div. 1959) Jenifer Unite (m. 1960)
- Children: Susan Vesey, Viscountess de Vesci; Antony Armstrong-Jones, 1st Earl of Snowdon; Peregrine Armstrong-Jones
- Parent(s): Sir Robert Armstrong-Jones; Margaret Roberts
- Education: Eton College; Magdalen College, Oxford (1922)
- Military career
- Allegiance: United Kingdom
- Branch: British Army
- Service years: c. 1914–1945
- Rank: Major
- Service number: 139806
- Units: Royal Regiment of Artillery; King's Royal Rifle Corps
- Conflicts: World War I World War II

Major Ronald Owen Lloyd Armstrong-Jones, MBE QC DL (né Jones; 18 May 1899 – 27 January 1966) was a British barrister and soldier. He was the father of Antony Armstrong-Jones, 1st Earl of Snowdon, and father-in-law of Princess Margaret, younger daughter of George VI.

== Early life and education ==
Born Ronald Owen Lloyd Armstrong Jones in Ilford, Essex, he was the only son of Sir Robert Jones, an eminent psychiatrist, and Margaret Roberts, daughter of Sir Owen Roberts. In 1912, his father legally changed the family surname to Armstrong-Jones by deed poll to distinguish himself from another Robert Jones. He was educated at Sandroyd School and Eton. He had two sisters, Elaine Margaret Wauchope (1895–1965) and Gwendolen Jane Buckley (1905–1985), who married Sir Denys Buckley.

== Career ==
During the First World War, Armstrong-Jones was commissioned as a Second Lieutenant into the Royal Regiment of Artillery from 1917 to 1919. After the war, he continued his education at Magdalen College, Oxford. While at Oxford he distinguished himself as a rower, helping the Magdalen crew to win the Grand Challenge Cup at Henley in 1921. He graduated in 1922, then became a barrister at the Inner Temple. In 1936, Armstrong-Jones served as High Sheriff of Caernarvonshire. During the Second World War he returned to the army and served as a Major in the King's Royal Rifle Corps; he was invalided out in 1945, after serving as Deputy Judge Advocate to Montgomery's staff in Normandy and being appointed a Member of the Order of the British Empire in the 1945 New Year Honours in recognition of his service. During the war, his home, Stream House at Henley Park, was requisitioned to the British Army.

He took silk in 1954. The following year, he was appointed a Lord Chancellor's Legal Visitor, whose function is to visit mental patients in hospitals and at home to ensure they are properly cared for and money allocated by the Court of Protection is properly applied and managed for their care. He was a liveryman of the Worshipful Company of Clothworkers and from 1955 to 1959 he was a member of the Industrial Disputes Tribunal. He also served as a Governor of St Bartholomew's Hospital.

He retired from his post as Legal Visitor in 1963, upon medical advice. The Lord Chancellor's office issued a statement on Armstrong-Jones's retirement: "His doctors have advised him that the constant travelling involved in the duties of the office is likely to be inimical to his health in the future."

== Personal life and death ==
Armstrong-Jones was married three times. Firstly, on 22 July 1925, to Anne Messel (8 February 1902 – July 1992), with whom he had two children:

- Susan Vesey, Viscountess de Vesci (12 February 1927 – May 1986), who married John Vesey, 6th Viscount de Vesci. They had four children.
- Antony Armstrong-Jones, 1st Earl of Snowdon (7 March 1930 – 13 January 2017), married Princess Margaret on 6 May 1960 (divorced on 11 July 1978) and created Earl of Snowdon in 1961 by his sister-in-law, Queen Elizabeth II. They had two children.

Armstrong-Jones' first marriage ended in divorce in 1934, and Anne later married the 6th Earl of Rosse. On 18 June 1936, Armstrong-Jones married secondly Australian Carol Akhurst, daughter of Sir Thomas Melrose Coombe. There were no children from this marriage. They divorced in 1959, and Carol was killed in a car crash in 1966.

He married thirdly Jenifer Unite Monro on 11 February 1960. Jenifer Unite, an air hostess, was the daughter of Basil Unite, a major fruit importer. They had one son:

- Peregrine John Walter Thomas Owen Llewelyn Armstrong-Jones (born 15 November 1960), married Caroline Therese Bloy. They had two children.

Armstrong-Jones underwent an operation in mid-1965 but did not recover. He was admitted to St Mary's Hospital, Paddington, in October 1965, and returned to his home, Plas Dinas, in Caernarfon, before Christmas. He died there on 27 January 1966 at the age of 66.
