= Antony Armstrong-Jones, 1st Earl of Snowdon =

British photographer and filmmaker (1930–2017)

The Right Honourable The Earl of Snowdon GCVO FRSA RDI
- The Earl of Snowdon in 1965

Member of the House of Lords
- Lord Temporal
- Hereditary peerage 6 October 1961 – 11 November 1999
- Preceded by: Peerage created
- Succeeded by: Seat abolished
- Life peerage 16 November 1999 – 31 March 2016

Personal details
- Born: Antony Charles Robert Armstrong-Jones; 7 March 1930 Belgravia, London, England
- Died: 13 January 2017 (aged 86) Kensington, London, England
- Resting place: St Baglan's Church, Llanfaglan, Wales
- Party: Crossbencher
- Spouses: Princess Margaret (m. 1960; div. 1978); Lucy Mary Lindsay-Hogg (m. 1978; div. 2000)
- Children: Polly Fry; David Armstrong-Jones, 2nd Earl of Snowdon; Lady Sarah Chatto; Lady Frances von Hofmannsthal; Jasper Cable-Alexander
- Parents: Ronald Armstrong-Jones (father); Anne Messel (mother)
- Education: Jesus College, Cambridge
- Occupation: Photographer

Antony Charles Robert Armstrong-Jones, 1st Earl of Snowdon (7 March 1930 – 13 January 2017), also known professionally as Lord Snowdon, was a British photographer. He was best known internationally for his portraits of prominent cultural and political figures, many of which were published in Vogue, Vanity Fair, The Sunday Times Magazine, The Sunday Telegraph Magazine, and other major outlets.

More than 280 of his photographs are held in the permanent collections of the National Portrait Gallery. Between 1968 and 1973, he directed several television documentaries and contributed to design and accessibility reforms. A committed advocate for disabled people, he helped shape policy and infrastructure across the United Kingdom.

In 1960, Armstrong-Jones married Princess Margaret, sister of Queen Elizabeth II, and was created Earl of Snowdon the following year. He and Princess Margaret eventually divorced in 1978.

== Early life ==
Antony Charles Robert Armstrong-Jones was born on 7 March 1930 at 25 Eaton Terrace in Belgravia, central London, the second child and only son of the Welsh barrister Ronald Armstrong-Jones (1899–1966) and his first wife, Anne Messel (later Countess of Rosse; 1902–1992). He was called Tony by his close relatives.

Armstrong-Jones's paternal grandfather was Sir Robert Armstrong-Jones, a Welsh psychiatrist. His paternal grandmother, Lady Armstrong-Jones (née Margaret Roberts), was one of the first 12 students at Somerville Hall (later Somerville College) in Oxford and was the daughter of the Welsh educationalist Sir Owen Roberts. Armstrong-Jones's maternal grandfather's family was of German-Jewish descent.

A maternal uncle was the stage designer Oliver Messel (1904–1978); a maternal great-grandfather was the Punch cartoonist Linley Sambourne (1844–1910); and his great-great-uncle Alfred Messel was a Berlin architect. His great-great-grandmother, Frances Linley, was a first cousin of Elizabeth Linley, wife of Richard Brinsley Sheridan.

Armstrong-Jones's parents divorced in early 1935, before his fifth birthday. His mother remarried later that year and had two more children.

As a 16-year-old he contracted polio while on holiday in Wales. During the six months that he was in the Liverpool Royal Infirmary recuperating, the only visitor from his family was his sister Susan. The illness left him with a withered left leg, one inch shorter than the other, and a slight permanent limp.

== Education ==
Armstrong-Jones was educated at two private boarding schools: first at Sandroyd School in Surrey from the autumn term of 1938, then, a year later, at Sandroyd's new site in Wiltshire up to 1943. After Sandroyd he attended Eton College, beginning in the autumn term of 1943. In March 1945, he qualified in the "extra special weight" class of the School Boxing Finals. He continued to box in 1946, gaining at least two flattering mentions in the Eton College Chronicle. In 1947, he was a coxswain in Eton's traditional "Fourth of June" Daylight Procession of Boats.

He then attended the University of Cambridge, where he studied architecture at Jesus College, but failed his second-year exams and did not complete his degree.

He coxed the winning Cambridge boat in the 1950 Boat Race.

== Career ==
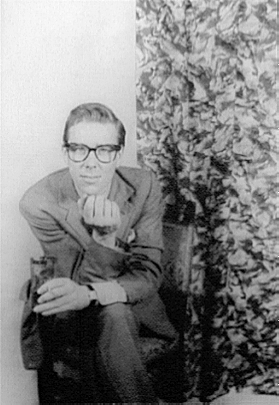
Armstrong-Jones in 1958, photographed by Carl Van Vechten

After university, Armstrong-Jones began a career as a photographer in fashion, design and theatre. His stepmother had a friend who knew Baron the photographer; Baron visited Armstrong-Jones in his London flat, which doubled as his work studio. Baron, impressed, agreed to bring on Armstrong-Jones as an apprentice, first on a fee-paying basis but eventually, as his talent and skills became apparent to Baron, as a salaried associate.

Much of his early commissions were theatrical portraits, often with recommendations from his uncle Oliver Messel, and "society" portraits highly favoured in Tatler, which, in addition to buying many of his photographs, gave him byline credit for the captions. He later became known for his royal studies, among which were the official portraits of Queen Elizabeth II and Prince Philip, Duke of Edinburgh during their 1957 tour of Canada. He was also an early contributor to Queen magazine, the magazine owned by his friend Jocelyn Stevens.

After marrying Princess Margaret in May 1960, Armstrong-Jones's first solo public engagement was on 7 December 1960, when he presented the 1960 National Challenge Trophies for the trade organisation the Photographic Information Council's School Photography competition, with entries from 200 schools in Britain with camera clubs, at the opening of an exhibition of the work. News of this event was covered in American and Australian newspapers, as well as in England.

In line with the usual royal practice when a king's daughter married a commoner, in October 1961 Armstrong-Jones was granted a peerage, becoming Earl of Snowdon, or Lord Snowdon.

In the early 1960s, Snowdon became the artistic adviser of The Sunday Times Magazine, and by the 1970s had established himself as one of Britain's most respected photographers. Though his work included everything from fashion photography to documentary images of inner-city life and the mentally ill, he is best known for his portraits of world notables, many of them published in Vogue, Vanity Fair, The Sunday Times Magazine, and The Sunday Telegraph Magazine.

His subjects included Marlene Dietrich, Laurence Olivier, Maggie Smith, Leslie Caron, Lynn Fontanne, David Bowie, Elizabeth Taylor, Rupert Everett, Anthony Blunt, David Hockney, Princess Grace of Monaco, Diana, Princess of Wales, Barbara Cartland, Raine Spencer (when she was Lady Lewisham), Desmond Guinness, British prime minister Harold Macmillan, Iris Murdoch, Tom Stoppard, Vladimir Nabokov, and J. R. R. Tolkien. More than 280 of his photographs are in the permanent collections of the National Portrait Gallery.

In 1968, he made his first documentary film, Don't Count the Candles, for the US television network CBS, on the subject of ageing. It won seven awards, including two Emmys. This was followed by Love of a Kind (1969), about the British and animals, Born to Be Small (1971) about people of restricted growth and Happy Being Happy (1973).

In October 1981, a group portrait by Snowdon of the British rock band Queen was used on the cover of their Greatest Hits album. A Snowdon portrait of Freddie Mercury was used in 2000 on the cover of Mercury's compilation box set The Solo Collection.

In 2000, Snowdon was given a retrospective exhibition at the National Portrait Gallery, Photographs by Snowdon: A Retrospective, which travelled to the Yale Center for British Art the following year. More than 180 of his photographs were displayed in an exhibition that honoured what the museums called "a rounded career with sharp edges". The retrospective highlighted Snowdon’s work across portraiture, fashion, and documentary photography, including iconic images of cultural figures such as David Bowie and members of the British royal family.

Snowdon was an Honorary Fellow of the Royal Photographic Society—he was awarded the Hood Medal of the Society in 1978 and the Progress Medal in 1985.

In 2006, Tomas Maier, creative director of the Italian fashion brand Bottega Veneta, brought in Snowdon to photograph his Autumn/Winter 2006 campaign.

== Designs and inventions ==
Snowdon co-designed (in 1963, with Frank Newby and Cedric Price) the "Snowdon Aviary" of the London Zoo (which opened in 1964); he later said it was one of his creations of which he was most proud, and affectionately called it the "birdcage". He also had a major role in designing the physical arrangements for the 1969 investiture of his nephew Prince Charles as Prince of Wales.

He was granted a patent for a type of electric wheelchair in 1971.

== Philanthropy and charity ==
=== Disabled persons ===
Contracting polio as a teenager left Snowdon with a shortened leg and a limp. As a result, in adulthood, he was a fierce and tireless campaigner for disabled people, and over several decades achieved dozens of groundbreaking political, economic, structural, transportation, and educational reforms for persons with any type of disability.

In the 1960s, he served as a council member of the Polio Research Fund, later renamed the National Fund for Research into Crippling Diseases. He served as a trustee of the National Fund for Research into Crippling Diseases, since renamed Action Medical Research.

In June 1980, Snowdon started an award scheme for disabled students. This scheme, administered by the Snowdon Trust, provides grants and scholarships for students with disabilities.

He was president for England of the International Year of Disabled Persons in 1981.

In 1981, he formed the Snowdon Council; it consisted of 12 members who coordinated a dozen different bodies concerned with helping disabled people.

=== The arts ===
During his first marriage, Snowdon was patron of the National Youth Theatre, the Contemporary Art Society for Wales, the Welsh Theatre Company, and the Civic Trust for Wales. He was also President of the British Theatre Museum.

He was provost of the Royal College of Art from 1995 to 2003.

== Personal life ==
Snowdon was married twice, first to Princess Margaret (1960 to 1978), and secondly to Lucy Mary Lindsay-Hogg (1978 to 2000).

=== First marriage ===
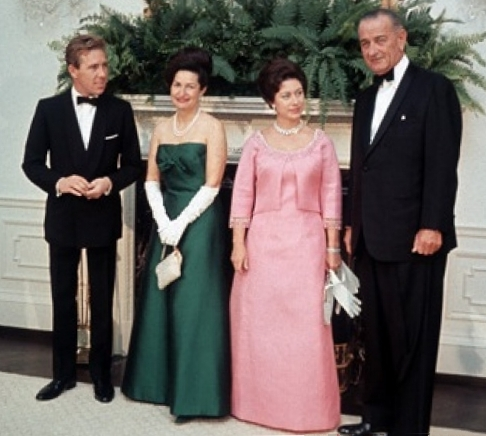
Lord Snowdon, Lady Bird Johnson, Princess Margaret, and the United States president Lyndon B. Johnson at the White House on 17 November 1965

In February 1960, Snowdon, then known as Antony Armstrong-Jones, became engaged to Queen Elizabeth II's sister, Princess Margaret, and they married on 6 May 1960 at Westminster Abbey. The ceremony was the first royal wedding to be broadcast on television. Despite the enthusiasm of the public, some critics disapproved of a commoner marrying into the royal family. The couple made their home in apartments at Kensington Palace. He was created Earl of Snowdon and Viscount Linley, of Nymans in the County of Sussex, on 6 October 1961. The couple had two children: David, born 1961, and Sarah, born 1964.

The couple remained married for eighteen years. Margaret and Snowdon separated in 1976, and the marriage ended in divorce in 1978.

In 2004, The Sunday Telegraph reported that Snowdon had fathered an illegitimate daughter shortly before marrying Princess Margaret. Polly Fry, born on 28 May 1960 in the third week of Lord Snowdon's marriage to Princess Margaret, was brought up as a daughter of Jeremy Fry, inventor and member of the Fry's chocolate family, and his wife Camilla. Polly Fry asserted that a DNA test in 2004 proved Snowdon's paternity. Jeremy Fry rejected her claim, and Snowdon denied having taken a DNA test. However, four years later, after Jeremy Fry had died, Snowdon admitted that this account was true.

=== Second marriage ===
After his divorce from Princess Margaret, Lord Snowdon married Lucy Mary Lindsay-Hogg (née Davies), the former wife of Sir Michael Lindsay-Hogg, 5th Baronet, in December 1978. In 1979, they had a daughter, Lady Frances Armstrong-Jones, who became a designer and board member of the Snowdon Trust. In 2006, Lady Frances married Rodolphe von Hofmannsthal (born 1980), the great-grandson of Hugo von Hofmannsthal. By 2024, Lady Frances was romantically partnered with Hugh Corcoran, with whom she operated the Yellow Bittern, a restaurant in London.

The Snowdons separated and subsequently divorced in 2000, after the revelation that in 1998 Snowdon had fathered a son, Jasper William Oliver Cable-Alexander, by Melanie Cable-Alexander, an editor at Country Life magazine.

=== Death ===
Lord Snowdon died at his home in Kensington on 13 January 2017, aged 86. His funeral took place on 20 January at St Baglan's Church in the remote village of Llanfaglan near Caernarfon. He was buried in the family plot in the churchyard.

== Publications ==
Snowdon authored and curated a book of his own photographs, entitled Snowdon: A Life in View. It was edited by his daughter Lady Frances von Hofmannsthal. Graydon Carter wrote the foreword and Patrick Kinmonth wrote the introduction. Tom Ford is listed as a contributor in the book's credentials. It was published by Rizzoli in 2017.

Generally, Snowdon's publications have been attributed to Antony Armstrong-Jones. Occasionally, the byline includes Earl of Snowdon, and most of the titles at least contain Snowdon in the title.

- London. London: Weidenfeld & Nicolson, 1958. (A later edition has ISBN 0-297-16763-4.)
- Private View: The Lively World of British Art (1965, with text by Bryan Robertson and John Russell)
- Assignments. London: Weidenfeld & Nicolson, 1972. ISBN 0-297-99582-0.
- A View of Venice. [Ivrea]: Olivetti, c1972.
- Snowdon: A Photographic Autobiography (Times Books, 1979)
- Personal View. London: Weidenfeld & Nicolson, 1979. ISBN 0-297-77715-7.
- Snowdon Tasmania Essay. Hobart: Ronald Banks, 1981. ISBN 0-85828-007-8. Text by Trevor Wilson.
- Sittings, 1979–1983. London: Weidenfeld & Nicolson, 1983. ISBN 0-297-78314-9.
- Israel: A First View. London: Weidenfeld & Nicolson, 1986. ISBN 0-297-78860-4.
- Stills 1984–1987. London: Weidenfeld & Nicolson, 1987. ISBN 0-297-79185-0.
- Serendipity: A Light-hearted Look at People, Places and Things. Brighton: Royal Pavilion, Art Gallery & Museums, 1989. ISBN 0-948723-10-6.
- Pride of the Shires: The Story of the Whitbread Horses
- Public Appearances 1987–1991. London: Weidenfeld & Nicolson, 1991. ISBN 0-297-83122-4.
- Hong Kong: Portraits of Power. Boston: Little, Brown, 1995. ISBN 0-316-22052-3. Text by Evelyn Huang and Lawrence Jeffery.
- Wild Flowers. London: Pavilion, 1995. ISBN 1-85793-783-X.
- Snowdon on Stage: With a Personal View of the British Theatre 1954–1996. London: Pavilion, 1996. ISBN 1-85793-919-0.
- Wild Fruit. London: Bloomsbury, 1997. ISBN 0-7475-3700-3. Text by Penny David.
- London: Sight Unseen. London: Weidenfeld & Nicolson, 1999. ISBN 0-297-82490-2. Text by Gwyn Headley.
- Photographs by Snowdon: A Retrospective. London: National Portrait Gallery, 2000. ISBN 1-85514-272-4.
- Snowdon. London: Chris Beetles Gallery, 2006. ISBN 1-871136-99-7.

== Titles, honours and arms ==
=== Peerage ===
Following his wedding, Armstrong-Jones was granted an earldom and introduced to the House of Lords as the Earl of Snowdon on 28 February 1962. The awarding of the earldom was in line with the practice of granting a peerage upon marriage into the royal family. Snowdon was appointed Constable of Caernarfon Castle in 1963; as part of this role, he designed and organised the Investiture of the Prince of Wales in 1969.

He made his maiden speech in the House of Lords in April 1972 on the problems that disabled people suffered in everyday life. One of his last contributions to the Lords was in response to the Queen's Speech of 1992.

On 16 November 1999, Lord Snowdon was created Baron Armstrong-Jones, of Nymans in the County of West Sussex. This was a life peerage given to him so that he could keep his seat in the House of Lords after most hereditary peers had been excluded. An offer of a life peerage was made to all hereditary peers of the first creation (those for whom a peerage was originally created, as opposed to those who inherited a peerage from an ancestor) at that time. The government of the day had expected Lord Snowdon to follow the example of members of the royal family and turn down his right to a life peerage. At the time, Labour MP Fraser Kemp said he was "shocked and surprised that someone who achieved their position in the House of Lords by virtue of marriage should accept a seat in the reformed Lords".

Snowdon retired from the House of Lords on 31 March 2016, having seldom attended nor claimed any expenses for many years.

=== Awards and honours ===
- 7 July 1969: Knight Grand Cross of the Royal Victorian Order (GCVO)
- 1985: Progress Medal of the Royal Photographic Society and an Honorary Fellowship
- 1989: honorary degree of Doctor of Laws (LL.D.) of the University of Bath.

=== Arms ===
Coat of arms of Antony Armstrong-Jones, 1st Earl of Snowdon
Notes Image sources: Crest A stag statant gules attired collared and unguled Or between two arms embowed in armour the hands proper each grasping a fleur-de-lis gold. Escutcheon Sable on a chevron argent, between in chief two fleurs-de-lis Or, and in base an eagle displayed Or, four pallets gules. Supporters Dexter, a griffin, and sinister, an eagle, each with wings elevated and addorsed Or. Compartment Land Motto A Noddo Duw A Noddir (Welsh: What God wills will be) Orders Royal Victorian Order circlet (Appointed GCVO 1969) Other elements Mantling

== In popular culture ==
Armstrong-Jones is portrayed by Matthew Goode in season 2 of the Netflix series The Crown, and by Ben Daniels in season 3.

They Might Be Giants included a song titled "Lord Snowdon" on their 2021 album BOOK.

== See also ==
- List of Cambridge University Boat Race crews
- List of Old Etonians born in the 20th century
- List of photographers
- List of University of Cambridge members

Peerage of the United Kingdom
New creation	Earl of Snowdon; 1961–2017; Member of the House of Lords (1961–2016)	Succeeded by David Armstrong-Jones
