= Annabel Whitehead =

British courtier and former lady-in-waiting to Queen Elizabeth II

The Honourable Dame Annabel Whitehead GCVO
- Born: Annabel Alice Hoyer Millar; 25 January 1943 (age 83)
- Spouse: Christopher Whitehead (m. 1973; died 2018)
- Children: 2
- Father: Frederick Millar, 1st Baron Inchyra
- Relatives: René de Marees van Swinderen (grandfather)

Dame Annabel Alice Hoyer Whitehead, GCVO (née Millar; born 25 January 1943) is a British courtier and former lady-in-waiting to Queen Elizabeth II.

== Biography ==
Whitehead was born on 25 January 1943 to Frederick Hoyer Millar, later 1st Baron Inchyra, and his wife, Jonkvrouw Anna Judith Elizabeth de Marees van Swinderen (1906–1999), herself the daughter of Jonkheer René de Marees van Swinderen, Minister of Foreign Affairs of the Netherlands.

In 1971, Whitehead was appointed a temporary lady-in-waiting to Princess Margaret, Countess of Snowdon. In 1965, Whitehead's elder sister Elizabeth had married the princess's onetime suitor Billy Wallace. She became an extra lady-in-waiting in 1975, a position she held until 1992, when she became lady-in-waiting until the princess's death in 2002.

After Princess Margaret's death, Whitehead was appointed a Woman of the Bedchamber to Queen Elizabeth II in 2002. She remained in that position until the queen's death in 2022. In late 2022, King Charles III appointed his late mother's ladies-in-waiting "Ladies of the Household", responsible for helping with events at Buckingham Palace.

In recognition of her service, she was appointed a Lieutenant of the Royal Victorian Order (LVO) in the 1986 Birthday Honours and subsequently promoted to a Commander (CVO), Dame Commander (DCVO) and Dame Grand Cross (GCVO) of the same order in the 2002 Demise Honours, 2014 New Year Honours and 2025 New Year Honours, respectively.

Whitehead married stockbroker Christopher James Bovill Whitehead (1939–2018) on 4 September 1973. They had two children, Daisy and Robert. She was widowed in 2018.
