= Lord Hammond =

Lord Hammond may refer to:

- Edmund Hammond, 1st Baron Hammond (1802–1890), civil servant, Permanent Under-Secretary of State for Foreign Affairs from 1854 to 1873
- Philip Hammond, Baron Hammond of Runnymede (born 1955), Conservative politician, Foreign Secretary from 2014 to 2016 and Chancellor of the Exchequer from 2016 to 2019
