= Frederick Millar, 1st Baron Inchyra =

British diplomat (1900–1989)

The Right Honourable The Lord Inchyra GCB GCMG
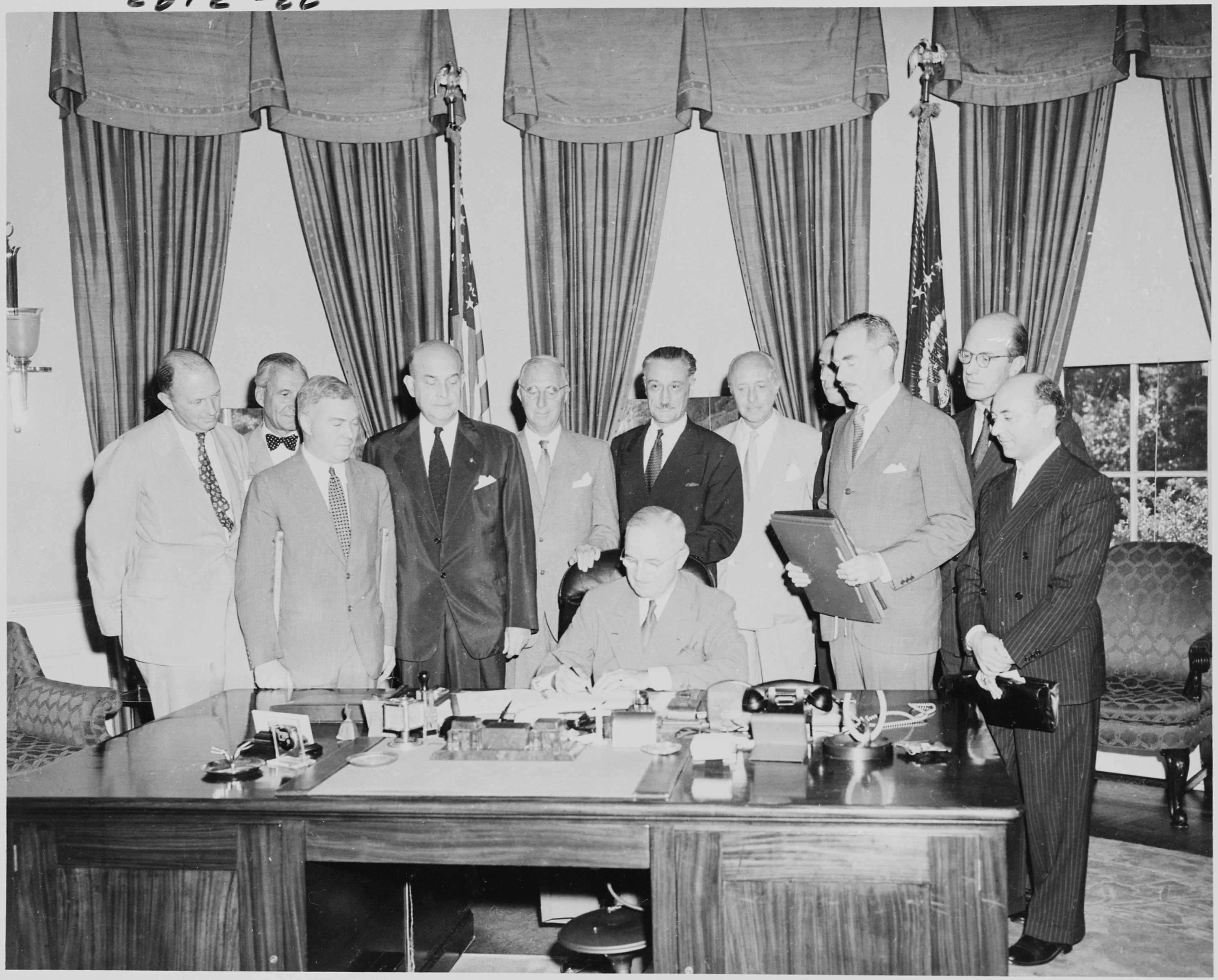
- Millar (first left) as U.S. President Harry S. Truman signs the North Atlantic Treaty (1949)

British Ambassador to West Germany
- In office 1955–1956
- Monarch: Elizabeth II
- Prime Minister: Anthony Eden
- Preceded by: office created
- Succeeded by: Christopher Steel

British High Commissioner at Allied High Commission
- In office 29 September 1953 – 5 May 1955
- Monarch: Elizabeth II
- Prime Minister: Sir Winston Churchill and Anthony Eden
- Preceded by: Ivone Kirkpatrick
- Succeeded by: office abolished

Permanent Under-Secretary of State for Foreign Affairs
- In office 1957–1962
- Prime Minister: Sir Anthony Eden and Harold Macmillan
- Preceded by: Ivone Kirkpatrick
- Succeeded by: Harold Caccia

Personal details
- Born: 6 June 1900
- Died: 16 October 1989 (aged 89) Celbridge, County Kildare, Ireland
- Education: Downside School
- Profession: Diplomat

Frederick Robert Hoyer Millar, 1st Baron Inchyra, GCMG, CVO (6 June 1900 – 16 October 1989) was a British diplomat who served as Ambassador to West Germany from 1955 to 1956.

== Background and early career ==
The son of Robert Hoyer Millar, he was educated at Wellington and New College, Oxford. Millar entered the Diplomatic Service in 1923, becoming Second Secretary in 1928 and First Secretary in 1935. He served in various capacities at the British embassies in Berlin, Paris and Cairo and at the Foreign Office. From 1934 to 1938 he was Assistant Private Secretary to the Foreign Secretary (Sir John Simon, Sir Samuel Hoare and Anthony Eden respectively).

== Senior diplomatic appointments ==
During the Second World War he served chiefly at the British embassy in Washington D.C., where he was also Minister Plenipotentiary from 1948 to 1950. Millar was also the United Kingdom Deputy at the North Atlantic Council from 1950 to 1952 and its Representative thereon from 1952 to 1953. The latter year Millar was appointed High Commissioner to the British Zone of occupied Germany, a post he held until 1955, and was then Ambassador to West Germany from 1955 to 1956. After his return to Britain he served as Permanent Under-Secretary at the Foreign Office from 1957 to 1962.

== Honours and personal life ==
Millar was made a Knight Commander of the Order of St Michael and St George (KCMG) in 1949 and then promoted to Knight Grand Cross of the same Order (GCMG) in 1956, and in 1962 he was raised to the Peerage of the United Kingdom as Baron Inchyra, of St Madoes in the County of Perth. He was appointed King of Arms of the Order of St Michael and St George in 1961.

Lord Inchyra married in 1931 Jonkvrouw Anna Judith Elisabeth de Marees van Swinderen (1906–1999), daughter of Jonkheer René de Marees van Swinderen, Dutch former Minister of Foreign Affairs (1908–1913) and Ambassador in London (1913–1937). They had four children, two sons and two daughters. Their older daughter Elizabeth married Billy Wallace in 1965.

Their younger daughter, Dame Annabel Whitehead, was a Lady-in-Waiting to Princess Margaret and later to the Queen.

His granddaughter Martha Hoyer Millar was married to Conservative Party politician Matt Hancock.

== Arms ==
Coat of arms of Frederick Millar, 1st Baron Inchyra

Crest
A cubit arm the hand erect and in the act of blessing Proper.
Escutcheon
Quarterly 1st Or a cross moline Azure and base barry undy Gules and Vert on a chief of the third a lozenge of the first between two spur-revels also of the first (Millar) 2nd per bend Argent and Vert a lion passant Gules (Hoyer) 3rd Azure a chevron Argent between two spur-revels in chief and a demi-moon reversed Or (van Swinderden) 4th Azure a cross Argent cantoned between four roses Or (de Marees).
Supporters
Two blackcock Proper.
Motto
Manent Optima Corlo (The Best Awaits In Heaven)

== Death ==
Lord Inchyra died in October 1989, aged 89. He was succeeded in the Barony by his elder son, Robert, the 2nd Baron Inchyra.

Diplomatic posts
Preceded by Sir Ivone Kirkpatrick	British High Commissioner at Allied High Commission; 1953–1955	Succeeded by Himself as Ambassador
Preceded by Himself as High Commissioner	British Ambassador to West Germany; 1955–1956	Succeeded by Sir Christopher Steel
Government offices
Preceded by Sir Ivone Kirkpatrick	Permanent Under-Secretary at the Foreign Office; 1957–1962	Succeeded by Sir Harold Caccia
Heraldic offices
Preceded by Sir Nevile Bland	King of Arms of the Order of St Michael and St George; 1962–1975	Succeeded by Sir Morrice James
Peerage of the United Kingdom
New creation	Baron Inchyra; 1962–1989	Succeeded by Robert Millar
