= Margaret set =

1940s / 1950s socialite group in England

The Margaret set was a socialite circle of people, including aristocrats and celebrities that were closely associated with Princess Margaret. The Margaret set garnered media attention in Britain's post-war society during the 1940s and 1950s due, in addition to its proximity to Margaret's renowned royal pomp and circumstance, to its members' relatable trials and tribulations with love and exuberant activities such as putting on playful performances. However, members of the group were not formally identified as the eponymous set until 1954.

== Notable members ==
- Princess Margaret – The younger sister of Elizabeth II, born in 1930. Appearances made by Princess Margaret at various social events and descriptions of her attire were frequently mentioned in style columns. She was regularly seen with affluent companions at lavish venues. At a time of post-war, concerns about national debt, austerity, and nuclear armament, the coverage of Margaret and her social circle stood out. In the late 1950s, she occasionally garnered attention for her demanding behavior and insistence on being addressed as "Ma'am".
- Sharman Douglas — An American debutante who moved to London in May 1947 following her father's appointment as United States ambassador to the United Kingdom. She began attending high profile events in London and became a close friend of Margaret, a fact noted by both American and British newspapers. The Douglases returned to the US in 1950, but Sharman returned to Britain for extended visits, either while working or on holiday.
- Lord John Spencer Churchill, Marquess of Blandford — The heir to the Duke of Marlborough and a childhood friend of Margaret. He is also known by his nickname, Sunny (derived from his title, the Earl of Sunderland). He was one of the earliest characters followed as part of the group and was contemporaneously regarded as Margaret's first boyfriend. Friends have maintained that he was the set member she would have liked to have married. He was the first of the set to marry, after which the family seat of Blenheim Palace continued to provide the venue for weekend parties and occasional fashion shows. His sister Rosemary Spencer Churchill was also part of the set.
- Lord John Montagu Douglas Scott, Earl of Dalkeith — aka John Scott, and known by his title, Dalkeith. The heir to the Duke of Buccleuch, he was a childhood friend and related to Margaret by marriage. The Buccleuch homes, Drumlanrig Castle and Broughton were favorite destinations for set gatherings. He was known to prefer country pursuits over city nightlife.
- Lady Caroline Montagu Douglas Scott, also known as Caroline Scott, Dalkeith's sister — As children, she and Margaret took dancing lessons together and attended the joint family wedding of Scott's aunt Lady Alice to Margaret's uncle Prince Henry, Duke of Gloucester. Margaret complained about the focus on male companions, saying, "The papers seldom dwell on my girlfriends, like Caroline, Rachel (Brand), and Laura (Smith). I spend far more time in their company than with anyone else."
- Mark Bonham Carter — After escaping from an Italian World War II POW camp in 1943, Grenadier Guards officer Bonham Carter was rewarded with an invitation to a Windsor Castle Gala night, where he danced with Princess Margaret. In 1944, he was assigned to the Guards garrison at the castle for a year. He became friends with the royal family, and from 1945 onwards was invited back for holidays. From then on, he appeared with them at events ranging from pheasant shoots on remote Scottish estates to Covent Garden ballets and nightclubs. His niece said he and Margaret had a "pre-Townsend" relationship, and she had photos where they looked "dashing as a couple."
- The Hon. Colin Tennant — Heir to the Baron Glenconner, who met Margaret in 1946, at a party for the daughter of the Earl of Cavan, and soon joined her on the London party circuit. Their friendship deepened in 1954, coinciding with short-lived rumors that they would marry. In 1954, he appeared with Margaret's friend Lady Anne Coke at a fancy dress ball. They married 1956, and purchased the island of Mustique, which would become Margaret's favorite holiday destination.
- Billy Wallace — A childhood friend from a wealthy family, he was first noticed dancing with the set at the Ritz in 1948. An early boyfriend of Margaret, he was one of the members of the set most frequently seen at theatres and nightclubs. He hosted house parties during Goodwood races and played polo against the Duke of Edinburgh.
- The Hon. Dominic Elliott — Son of the Earl of Minto. He first came into the spotlight during the mid-1950s, from which time he was often seen in the royal circle. He became a long-time friend, more famed for a second time around romance with Margaret in the early 1970s, and as a regular visitor to the island of Mustique.
- Judy Montagu — Quickly became a prominent set member when she came to public notice in 1954, while producing The Frog play. She was an organizer and party host who sometimes appeared on panel shows. She moved permanently to Rome in 1958, where she organized events for a royal visit. There was contemporary speculation that she was the illegitimate daughter of the Earl of Dudley.
- The Hon. Peter Ward — Son of the Earl of Dudley. He was often seen with childhood friend Billy Wallace and possible half-sister Judy Montagu. He received the most attention and an engagement rumor when he and Douglas threw a set party in 1949. His brother Lord Ednam was also sometimes part of the set.
- The Hon. Laura Smith — Descendant of the founder of retailer WHSmith and daughter of the 3rd Viscount Hambleden, who met Margaret during their teens. Margaret was also sometimes joined on the party circuit and for weekends at the Viscount's manor-house by her younger sister Kate and older brother Harry, who became the 4th Lord Hambleden aged 17, when their father died. Smith was particularly supportive during the aftermath of Margaret's own father's death, accompanying her twice a week to Lenten Lectures.
- Prince Nikola of Yugoslavia — Nephew of the Duchess of Kent. He spent much time with Margaret in the months before and after the death of George VI in 1952, including a visit to Paris in 1951. Reports emerged suggesting a romantic relationship, which attracted press commentary. He had a traitorous reputation in his home country due to the pact he made with Germany during World War II, while he was regent. Nicholas joined the cast of The Frog, later left, and died aged 25 in 1954 when his car overturned on his way to meet with them at a dress rehearsal.
- Tom Egerton — Racehorse breeder who was seen with the set from the late 1940s, mainly in the background at balls and parties, and more prominently at race meetings. There was intensive interest in him as Margaret's "newest friend" in February 1949, when she went to stay at his home.

At various times, the set also included childhood and teenage friends Lady Caroline Thynne, Rachel Brand, Julian Fane, Robin McEwen, David Ogilvy and Reverend Simon Phipps. In addition, it included palace staff members Lord Porchester, Lord Plunkett, lady-in-waiting Jennifer Bevan, who married John Lowther and was replaced by Iris Peake. David Milford Haven squired Margaret and Sharman Douglas to dances before his engagement. Lord Wilton hosted house parties with Judy Montagu.

== Celebrity Associations ==
The set was sometimes joined by well-known characters from entertainment and the arts, politics, and journalism.

- Christian Dior — According to Dean Mayo Davies of AnOther Magazine, "Coming of age, [Margaret], who, as it has become legendary, knew the shortcut to a good time, would need a few pieces of bobby-dazzler couture", and he would produce over the decades a plethora of high-fashion pieces for her, which she would wear to and thereby promote at events where the Margaret set was present, for example her 21st birthday party. Margaret has been credited with popularizing Dior's "New Look".
- Ludovic Kennedy — In July 1947, future investigative journalist Kennedy, then at Oxford University, went to dances with the princesses at Holyrood Palace during the royal family's residence. Shortly after he was invited to stay at Balmoral but being "assailed by feelings of inadequacy" he made an excuse and declined to go. A few years later, he and his wife, Moira Shearer, got to know the set, primarily due to their friendship with Dalkeith and attendance at his country gatherings.
- Danny Kaye — In February 1948, several members of the royal family met Kaye backstage after his shows at the London Palladium. He developed a close relationship with the royal family, being particularly friendly with Margaret and Sharman Douglas. He accepted an invitation to return to the UK to star in the Royal Command Performance and returned for royal premieres of his films and other events while in Britain for several years. His laid-back nature occasionally caused comment, such as when he was overheard addressing Margaret with "honey" instead of "ma'am."
- Eddie Fisher — In May 1953, Fisher performed at a coronation ball. Fisher expressed admiration for Margaret and interest in meeting members of the aristocracy. In 1957, he was invited to perform at a Savoy ball that the set were attending. Reports said Margaret was "very annoyed" because a Fisher representative had requested she send him a personal invitation to the event. At the ball, Fisher was only invited to sing minutes after she left. Afterwards he denied authorizing the request, but they appeared not to have spoken again. Later, Fisher's daughter and ex-wife said he told them of a brief affair he had with Margaret after the coronation ball in 1953.

Others included Merle Oberon, David Niven, Maureen Swanson, Greta Garbo, and Hugh Fraser MP.

== History ==
=== Nightlife ===
In 1948, the Sunday Pictorial challenged "Margaret's week of late nights," detailing the previous week's revelry and asking whether it was setting a good example. The article prompted discussion in the international media. However, according to Marion Crawford, behind closed doors, it made for a difficult situation.

The British Press Strike (March–April 1955) primarily affected national newspapers and local dailies from the south of England. Meanwhile, American papers reported on a set visit to the "exuberant" Stork Room. She probably wouldn't have frequented this place, they commented, but London newspapers are on strike and her escapades won't be chronicled locally. On another occasion in the Stork Room, London gangster Jack Spot gave up his "best table" so Margaret and her friends could have it. One reporter claimed that around this time it was "impossible to go pub crawling in London without bumping into Margaret in some bottle club or after-hours spot".

=== Fox hunting ===
Rarely seen riding with hounds, Margaret preferred following fox hunts in a car, commonly a Land Rover. Her attendance at these events still caused protesting letters from the League Against Cruel Sports.

=== Retrospective re-evaluation ===
When Princess Margaret's engagement was announced in 1960, it was suggested that some people were relieved that she was not going to marry someone from the Margaret set, which was "considered an aimless, ill-mannered lot." Later reminiscences included that she had "launched herself into the slightly louche world of London nightlife" with those considered to be "a crowd of aristocratic hedonists."
