= Frank Roberts (diplomat) =

British diplomat

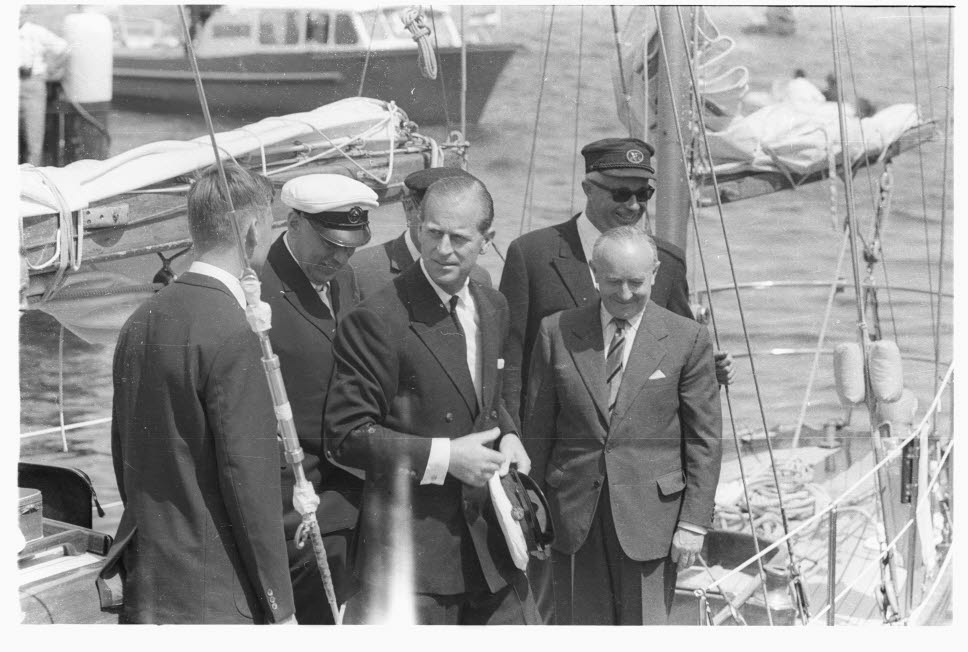
Roberts (behind Prince Philip) sailing with HMY Bloodhound during Kiel Week, 1966

Sir Frank Kenyon Roberts GCMG GCVO (27 October 1907 – 7 January 1998) was a British diplomat who played a key role in developing Anglo-Soviet and Anglo-German relations from the 1940s to the 1960s..

== Biography ==
Born in Buenos Aires, Argentina, where his parents worked for Lever Brothers, Roberts was the grandson of the filmmaker James Kenyon, of Mitchell and Kenyon fame. Roberts' father, Henry George, hailed from the Lancashire town of Preston, and was from a middle-class background of lawyers, doctors and engineers. His mother, Gertrude (daughter of James Kenyon), was from nearby Blackburn and was more working-class. Roberts lived in Southport, Rishton and Accrington (all in Lancashire) after 1914. He was educated at Bedales School, Rugby School and Trinity College, Cambridge, where he graduated with first-class honours in history. The young Roberts showed a keen interest in international affairs (at the time he praised the Locarno treaties of 1925, for example), and he considered himself temperamentally and intellectually well-suited to a diplomatic career. Although the Foreign Office and the Diplomatic Service had long been the preserve of those of aristocratic origins, Roberts was able to join (in 1930) because recent reforms made it accessible to those without independent means. He achieved first place in the exams, not least because he had developed an excellent command of French and German since his time at Bedales (later, he learned Arabic as well).

Roberts' first overseas posting was to Paris, where he impressed the ambassador with his aptitude for a diplomatic career, followed by Cairo, where he participated in the effort to negotiate the Anglo-Egyptian treaty of 1936. Also in Egypt he married (1937) Celeste Leila Beatrix 'Cella' Shoucair (died 1990), who was of a distinguished Lebanese and Egyptian background. From both his Paris and Cairo vantage points Roberts monitored the European scene, where the dictators Hitler and Mussolini were asserting themselves with increasing force, alongside addressing local challenges such as the rise of nationalist sentiment in Egypt (which although not formally part of the British Empire was under British control). Roberts returned to London in 1937 to work in the Central Department of the Foreign Office. He opposed the appeasement of Nazi Germany but as a junior official he was not in a position to make a dent on policy (in any case, Prime Minister Neville Chamberlain paid little heed to the concerns even of senior officials such as Robert Vansittart).

He visited Moscow in the summer of 1939 to support Ambassador William Seeds and head of the Foreign Office's Central Department, William Strang, in talks with the Soviet Union to contain German expansionism, but was shocked soon after by news of the Molotov-Ribbentrop Pact. The arrangement allowed Germany to wage war without fear of Soviet intervention. The Pact demonstrated to Roberts that geopolitics could supersede ideological antipathies, and even after the German strike on the Soviet Union in 1941 brought Moscow and London into alliance he was always wary of the prospect of another agreement between Moscow and Berlin. Generally, the experience of the 1930s taught Roberts the need for strong defences and firm alliances, and to be willing to intervene at the first signs of a threat to peace and equilibrium.

=== World War Two ===
After the outbreak of the Second World War in September 1939, Roberts served as British joint secretary of the Anglo French Supreme War Council (SWC), which included acting as interpreter during the third meeting of the SWC at 10 Downing Street on 17 November 1939.

A rising star, he also played an important role in the wartime Central Department in shaping British policies. This included playing down the Katyn Massacre in favour of preserving the Anglo-Soviet alliance, although otherwise he sought to uphold the interests of smaller powers such as Poland. He came to front-page attention in Britain in 1943 because of his role in the successful negotiations with Salazar of Portugal to enable British military use of the Azores (Roberts' time in Lisbon was also significant because it was there that he began his friendship with the American diplomat George F. Kennan). He was promoted to the head of the Central Department in 1943, aged just 36.

An advisor to Churchill at the Yalta Conference in February 1945, he defended the outcome of the conference on the grounds that in itself the Yalta agreement (which upheld democratic governance) was perfectly satisfactory but there was little that Britain and the United States could do to influence Soviet actions in eastern Europe. Roberts's reports from Moscow, where he was based as Minister 1945-47 and served frequently as chargé d’affaires, drew on Kennan's 'Long Telegram' (1946) and called for a firmer stance towards the Soviet Union in the light of Soviet attacks on British and American interests in the post-war world. His arguments went down well in Whitehall and helped to shape the British Cold War strategy that would remain in place until the collapse of the Soviet Union in 1991.

As Ernest Bevin's Principal Private Secretary, Roberts returned to Moscow in 1948 for negotiations with Stalin and Molotov during the Berlin blockade crisis in 1948. He acquitted himself well in this high-profile and physically-demanding position (the Soviet hosts liked to start the talks late at night and to go on for hours). Serving as Deputy High Commissioner in newly independent India (1949-51) broadened Roberts' horizons, but he was glad to return to London to engage once more with the European affairs with which he was so familiar. As a Foreign Office Deputy Under-Secretary (1951-54) he was effective (some might say obstructive) in opposing Winston Churchill's pursuit of détente with the Soviet Union, on the grounds that any relaxation of tensions would be only temporary given the inherent antipathy of the Soviet Union to the West and would derail the consolidation of the Western bloc, which then well under way since the birth of NATO in 1949.

After the collapse of the European Defence Community scheme, he played an important and largely unsung role in 1954 alongside Anthony Eden in the sensitive diplomacy that led to the rearmament and NATO membership of the Federal Republic of Germany. He therefore contributed decisively to the growth of the transatlantic security structure that endures today. As Permanent Representative to the North Atlantic Council (1954-57) he helped defuse the controversy over the Sandys defence review and he took part in successful negotiations to obtain German support for the British military presence in Federal Germany.

As Ambassador in Moscow (1960-62) he provided London with vital insights into Soviet policies during the Berlin and Cuban missile crises in 1961 and 1962 respectively, and won the respect of Nikita Khrushchev. As Ambassador in Bonn (1962-68) he helped to orchestrate a state visit in 1965 from Queen Elizabeth II which played an important role in improving Anglo-German relations. He strove to cultivate support in Bonn for the latest British bid to join the European Economic Community (EEC), although the commitment of chancellors Ludwig Erhard and Kurt Georg Kiesinger to close relations with President Charles de Gaulle of France meant that Roberts achieved only limited success. Although never a federalist ideologue, Roberts considered that EEC membership would extend Britain's influence on the continent and would strengthen the British economy, but it would not be until 1973 that Britain achieved membership.

Although a consumer rather than a producer of covert intelligence, Roberts was very knowledgeable about intelligence matters. During the Second World War, MI5 head Guy Liddell drew on his expertise, and he was conversant with covert operations behind the Iron Curtain in the late 1940s. In Moscow in 1961, Roberts was one of the first Western officials to deal with the walk-in Soviet spy Oleg Penkovsky, who despite only a short-lived career became a valuable asset to British and American intelligence. He was Ambassador in Bonn when intelligence operative and spy novelist David Cornwell, better known as John le Carré, worked at the Embassy there; there is evidence of a friendship between the two men. Alongside the Duncan Report (1969) about British representation abroad, Roberts produced a top secret assessment of British intelligence stations abroad; the document remains classified, although there is evidence that it recommended economies in countries where both the Secret Intelligence Service and the Security Service operated.

Roberts was awarded a CMG in 1946, knighted KCMG in 1956, advanced to GCMG in 1963, and made GCVO in 1965. He won the confidence of the many ministers he served, including Churchill, Ernest Bevin, Anthony Eden, Harold Macmillan, Rab Butler, Edward Heath, Harold Wilson, Michael Stewart, and George Brown. He also developed a good relationship with numerous renowned foreign leaders and diplomats, including Josip Broz Tito, Konrad Adenauer, Willy Brandt, Helmut Schmidt, George F. Kennan and Paul-Henri Spaak. Roberts, who journalists dubbed the ‘Little Minister’, the ‘Human Dynamo’ and the ‘Pocket Hercules’ on account of how he combined modest height with great energy, was highly skilled both as a diplomatic analyst and negotiator. He won glowing plaudits from many people with whom he worked; Thomas Brimelow considered him to be a 'superlative operator', and Kennan described him as nothing less than ‘the most supremely competent of all the professional diplomatists I have known’. Adenauer praised his ‘intelligence, prudence and skill’, and found his unaffected demeanour refreshing compared to ‘the proverbial stiffness of the British Foreign Service officer’. Even Stalin was impressed; for him, Roberts was ‘a sharp-witted and capable person’. However, Roberts was capable of creating unnecessary antagonism; in 1940, even as a junior official, he angered Neville Chamberlain, who complained bitterly about some blunt comments that Roberts had committed to a file.

Roberts displayed his ambitions from the outset, while his tendency to organise and overrule others sometimes led his London colleagues to favour sending him abroad. Roberts' character deficits, although modest compared with his more favourable qualities, may explain why he never achieved the Foreign Office's top role, that of Permanent Undersecretary; Selwyn Lloyd suggested unequivocally in 1961 that if Roberts ‘ever became head of the [Foreign] Office, there would be a revolution'.

=== Later life ===
Roberts retired in 1968, serving as a member of the Duncan committee on overseas representation, president of the British Atlantic Committee and of the European Atlantic Group and on the council of Chatham House. His main interest remained with Germany: he was president of the German chamber of commerce and industry in the UK, chairman of the steering committee of the Königswinter conference, member of the Board of Governors of the European Institute for the Media and a founder member of the young Königswinter conference. He was the longest-serving president (1974–98) of the British-German Association.

He also held non-executive directorships of German and British companies, including Mercedes-Benz and Unilever. He was noted in the Economist in 1977 as one of the 44 ‘British boardroom elite’. The range and success of Roberts' retirement activities showed that the skills of a diplomat carry weight even beyond the realm of inter-governmental relations. His interests outside his professional life included reading historical works, listening to music and following sports news. He and his wife were aficionados of the arts, including ballet, theatre, paintings and sculpture and they enjoyed collecting antiques. The British Museum holds a collection of glassware and Russian icons that the Roberts had acquired over the years.

Roberts's memoirs, Dealing with Dictators (1991), give a good synopsis of his career but are somewhat bland and marred by a tendency to project current concerns into the past. Despite the end of the Cold War, he advocated NATO expansion (in contrast to the arguments of George F. Kennan, who thought that expanding NATO would feed Russian nationalism). He was always accessible to historians throughout his retirement, although he was wary of revisiting topics that might open up fresh controversy. In the 1990s he became known as a commentator on historical documentaries about some of the issues with which he had been involved. His appearances included the esteemed CNN/BBC series Cold War (1998). Ultimately, Roberts' career demonstrates the role of the individual, including those who operate largely behind the scenes, in shaping international developments.

Roberts lived in Kensington, London, where he died on 7 January 1998.

== Publications ==
- Roberts, Frank (1991). Dealing with dictators: The Destruction and Revival of Europe 1930–70. London: Weidenfeld & Nicolson. ISBN 0-297-81197-5.
- Roberts, Frank, ‘Ernest Bevin as Foreign Secretary’, in Ritchie Ovendale (ed.), The Foreign Policy of the British Labour Governments 1945–1951 (Leicester: Leicester University Press, 1984), pp.21–42.
- Roberts, Frank, ‘Is Germany’s Ostpolitik Dangerous?’, Encounter, May 1971, pp.62–68.
- Roberts, Frank, ‘Russia Under Stalin and Khrushchev: Some Personal Impressions’, Britain-USSR, 75 (December 1986), pp.1–3.
- Roberts, Frank K., ‘The British Approach to International Affairs’, India Quarterly, 6:1 (1950), pp.18–30.
- Roberts, Frank, ‘The 600-Year Alliance’, Illustrated London News (1 June 1973), pp.59, 61.

Diplomatic posts
Preceded by Sir Pierson Dixon	Principal Private Secretary to the Foreign Secretary; 1947–1949	Succeeded by Sir Roderick Barclay
Preceded by Sir Ivo Mallet	Ambassador Extraordinary and Plenipotentiary at Belgrade; 1954–1957	Succeeded by Sir John Nicholls
Preceded by Sir Patrick Reilly	Ambassador Extraordinary and Plenipotentiary at Moscow; 1960–1962	Succeeded by Sir Humphrey Trevelyan
Preceded by Sir Christopher Steel	Ambassador Extraordinary and Plenipotentiary at Bonn; 1963–1968	Succeeded by Sir Roger Jackling
