= Ivone Kirkpatrick =

British diplomat

Sir Ivone Kirkpatrick GCB GCMG
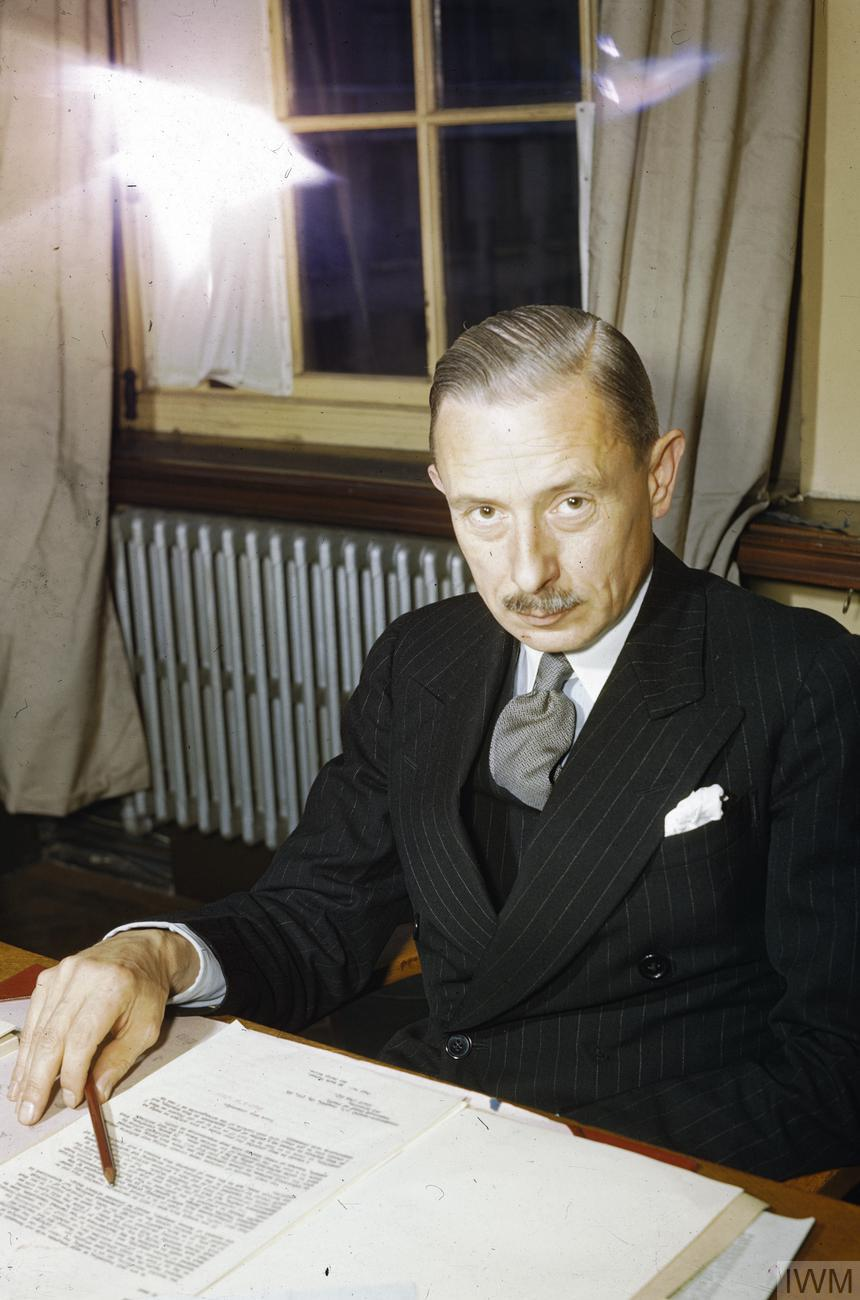
- Kirkpatrick at his desk in London as Deputy Commissioner to the Inter-Allied Control Commission in Germany in 1944

British High Commissioner at Allied High Commission
- In office 1950–1953
- Monarch: Elizabeth II
- Prime Minister: Sir Winston Churchill
- Preceded by: Brian Robertson, 1st Baron Robertson of Oakridge
- Succeeded by: Frederick Millar, 1st Baron Inchyra

Permanent Under-Secretary of State for Foreign Affairs
- In office 1953–1957
- Prime Minister: Sir Anthony Eden
- Preceded by: William Strang, 1st Baron Strang
- Succeeded by: Frederick Millar, 1st Baron Inchyra

Chairman of the Independent Television Authority
- In office 1957–1962
- Preceded by: Kenneth Clark
- Succeeded by: Charles Hill

Personal details
- Born: 3 February 1897 Wellington, Madras Presidency, British Raj
- Died: 25 May 1964 (Aged 67) Celbridge, County Kildare, Ireland
- Spouse: Lady Violet Kirkpatrick
- Children: Ivone Peter Kirkpatrick (1930–2013); Cecilia Sybil Kirkpatrick (1932–Unknown)
- Education: Downside School
- Profession: Diplomat

Sir Ivone Augustine Kirkpatrick, GCB, GCMG (3 February 1897 – 25 May 1964) was a British diplomat who served as the British High Commissioner in Germany after World War II, and as the Permanent Under-Secretary of State for Foreign Affairs, the highest-ranking civil servant in the Foreign Office.

== Early life and family ==
Kirkpatrick was born on 3 February 1897 in Wellington, India, the elder son of Colonel Ivone Kirkpatrick (1860–1936) of the South Staffordshire Regiment, and his wife, Mary Hardinge (d. 1931), daughter of General Sir Arthur Edward Hardinge, later Commander-in-Chief, Bombay Army, and Governor of Gibraltar.

His father was a descendant of a Scottish family that settled in Ireland during the eighteenth century. His mother was former Maid of Honour to Queen Victoria, and her grandfather Henry Hardinge, 1st Viscount Hardinge, served in the cabinets of Wellington and Peel, and was later governor-general of India in 1844–1848. Her first cousin Charles Hardinge, 1st Baron Hardinge of Penshurst was Permanent Under-Secretary of the Foreign Office in 1906–1910 and 1916–1920, and Viceroy of India in 1910–1916.

Being a Roman Catholic, Kirkpatrick was sent to Downside School to be educated between 1907 and 1914. Kirkpatrick volunteered for active service on the outbreak of the First World War and was commissioned in November 1914 in the Royal Inniskilling Fusiliers. Severely wounded in action against the Turks in August 1915, he was accepted by Balliol College, Oxford, in October, but chose to resume his war service early in 1916 when he was employed in propaganda and intelligence activities for the GHQ intelligence service Wallinger London. During the last year of the war he was stationed in Rotterdam in the Netherlands as replacement for Sigismund Payne Best. From there he worked as a spy master, running a network of Belgian resistance agents operating in German-occupied Belgium.

== Early career in the Foreign Office ==
He entered the diplomatic service in July 1919. He was firstly posted to Brazil for one year, returning to London in August 1920 to take up a post in the Western Department of the Foreign Office. He was promoted second secretary in December 1920 and first secretary in October 1928. On 10 January 1929 he married Violet Caulfield, daughter of Colonel Reginald James Cope Cottell, army surgeon, of 7 Phillimore Terrace, London; they had one son, Ivone Peter (1930–2013), and one daughter, Cecilia Sybil (1932–Unknown).

Kirkpatrick was then posted to the British Embassy at Rome from 1930 to 1932; chargé d'affaires at the Vatican in 1932–33; and first secretary at the British Embassy at Berlin from 1933 to 1938. It was during this time that he got firsthand experience of dealing with the emerging European dictatorships.

== Second World War ==
During the Second World War Kirkpatrick was once again employed in the propaganda and information work which he had so relished twenty-five years earlier. Appointed Director of the Foreign Division of the Ministry of Information in April 1940, he became Controller of the European services of the BBC in October 1941. During this time, he made a major contribution which included the task of interviewing Hitler's deputy, Rudolf Hess, following Hess's flight to Scotland in May 1941. His report on Hess was shown only to the Prime Minister, Winston Churchill, Foreign Secretary Anthony Eden, Lord Privy Seal Clement Attlee and Minister of Aircraft Production Lord Beaverbrook. In September 1944 Kirkpatrick was appointed to organize the British element of the Allied Control Commission for Germany, and following the end of the war he served at Supreme Headquarters Allied Expeditionary Force (SHAEF) as British political adviser to U.S. General Dwight D. Eisenhower until that organization's disbandment. After the war, he became Permanent Under-Secretary for the German Section at the Foreign Office in 1949.

== British High Commissioner for Germany ==
In June 1950, Kirkpatrick was appointed by King George VI as British High Commissioner for Germany. As one of the three joint sovereigns of western Germany, Kirkpatrick carried immense responsibility particularly with respect to the negotiation of the Bonn conventions during 1951–52, which terminated the occupation regime and (in parallel) prepared the way for the rearmament of West Germany. Between 1950 and 1953, one of his advisors in the High Commission was Mary Creighton Bailey. In November 1953, Kirkpatrick was brought back to London to succeed Sir William Strang as Permanent Under-Secretary.

One of the things that Kirkpatrick is most famous for during this time, was his January 1953 decision ordering the arrest of what he described as a "high-level cabal of neo-Nazis intent on undermining German democracy". This clandestine organization of former Nazi officials came to be known as the Naumann Circle.

== Permanent Under-Secretary ==
Sir Ivone Kirkpatrick succeeded Sir William Strang as Permanent Under-Secretary (PUS) in 1953. In his memoirs, Kirkpatrick later recalled his thoughts on taking up his new position:

From my long years of previous service in the Foreign Office I knew what was in store for me and, like any athlete, went into training. I gave up smoking and drinking, went to parties as little as I could and took a brisk walk through the park to the office every morning. Only so was I able to last the course.

Kirkpatrick was related to a former PUS, his mother being first cousin to Charles Hardinge. He joined the Office in February 1919 after spending the previous three years in wartime intelligence and propaganda work, an activity to which he returned when in 1941 he became foreign adviser to the BBC. Serving as head of Chancery in Berlin during 1933–1938, he made clear his detestation of the Nazis. His views seem not, however, to have made any great impression on the British Ambassador, Sir Neville Henderson. After 1945 he was once again involved with German affairs, serving for a year in the Office's Germany Section and then, during 1950–1953, as High Commissioner in Bonn. Kirkpatrick had a reputation as a combative, even aggressive, Irishman, who had little time for discussion. He was not, according to some of his former colleagues, the easiest of men to work with, and in Lord Gladwyn's opinion he would have made 'an excellent general'.

=== Suez Crisis ===
Kirkpatrick's difficult period as PUS culminated in the Suez Crisis of 1956, an event that was little referred to in his memoirs, The Inner Circle (London, 1959). Convinced that the nation's survival was dependent upon the exercise of great power responsibilities, he encouraged the Prime Minister, Anthony Eden, in his dangerous fixation with Nasser as a Middle Eastern Hitler. The experience of the 1930s had led both men to oppose any 'appeasement' of Nasser. Kirkpatrick's closeness to Eden was reinforced by the Prime Minister's dissatisfaction with what he perceived as a pro-Arab stance held by his Foreign Office subordinates during the last Churchill administration. As a result, Eden increasingly used Kirkpatrick as an intermediary between himself and other senior officials in the Office. This close relationship took an ominous turn when the PUS found himself obliged to exclude the Foreign Office from the decision-making process during the final crisis. For Kirkpatrick, the Suez debacle was a test of Britain's great power status, leading him later to reflect that:

No country [in the Western world] can any longer pursue an independent foreign policy. The liberty of action of each is in varying degrees restricted by the need to obtain the concurrence of one or more members of the alliance.

As Permanent Under-Secretary during the Suez Crisis Kirkpatrick was in favour of a strong line against Colonel Nasser. In a letter to the British Ambassador on 10 September 1956, Kirkpatrick said:

If we sit back while Nasser consolidates his position and gradually acquires control of the oil-bearing countries, he can and is, according to our information, resolved to wreck us. If Middle Eastern oil is denied to us for a year or two, our gold reserves will disappear. If our gold reserves disappear, the sterling area disintegrates. If the sterling area disintegrates and we have no reserves, we shall not be able to maintain a force in Germany, or indeed, anywhere else. I doubt whether we shall be able to pay for the bare minimum necessary for our defence. And a country that cannot provide for its defence is finished.

Sir Evelyn Shuckburgh said of Kirkpatrick: "He was so sharp that he cut". However, Suez sullied Kirkpatrick's reputation as PUS, though he may have been guilty of no more than fulfilling a civil servant's duty of loyalty to his political chiefs.

== Retirement and death ==
After retiring from the Foreign Office in February 1957 Kirkpatrick served for five years as chairman of the Independent Television Authority. In addition to his memoirs he wrote Mussolini: Study of a Demagogue (published posthumously in 1964). He was appointed Companion of the Order of St Michael and St George (CMG) in 1939, Knight Commander (KCMG) in 1948, Knight Commander of the Order of the Bath (KCB) in 1951, Knight Grand Cross of the Order of St Michael and St George (GCMG) in 1953, and Knight Grand Cross of the Order of the Bath (GCB) in 1956. He died at his home, Donacomper, Celbridge, County Kildare, Ireland, on 25 May 1964. He was survived by his wife and two children.

== Publications ==
- The Inner Circle: The Memoirs of Ivone Kirkpatrick (London: Macmillan, 1959).
- Mussolini: Study of a Demagogue (London: Odhams, 1964).

Diplomatic posts
Preceded by General Brian Hubert Robertson	British High Commissioner at Allied High Commission; 1950–1953	Succeeded by Sir Frederick Millar
Government offices
Preceded by William Strang	Permanent Under-Secretary at the Foreign Office; 1953–1957	Succeeded by Harold Caccia
Media offices
Preceded by Kenneth Clark	Chairman of the Independent Television Authority; 1957–1962	Succeeded by Charles Hill
