= Billy Wallace (socialite) =

British socialite

- Born: William Euan Wallace; 7 February 1927; London, England
- Died: 4 February 1977 (aged 49); London, England
- Occupation: Socialite
- Known for: Relationship with Princess Margaret
- Spouse: Elizabeth Hoyer Millar
- Parents: Euan Wallace (father); Barbara Lutyens (mother)

William Euan Wallace (7 February 1927 – 4 February 1977) was a British leading socialite of the 1950s whose close friendship with Princess Margaret caused open speculation about a possible engagement.

== Background and early life ==
The Wallace family were inheritors of the fortune of William Baird and Company, a nineteenth century family firm of coal and ironmasters from Lanarkshire who became one of Britain’s richest families.

Wallace’s father, Euan Wallace was a Conservative MP and minister in the Chamberlain government. He married Lady Idina Sackville in 1913, retaining custody of their two sons following their divorce in 1919. He then remarried to Wallace’s mother Barbara Lutyens, the daughter of architect Edwin Lutyens in 1920. They had three sons, of whom Wallace was the youngest.

The Wallaces mingled with high society and associated with the British royal family. As a child he featured in society magazines and picnicked with Princesses Elizabeth and Margaret.

Euan Wallace died in 1941 following an operation. By August 1946, all four of Wallace’s servicemen brothers had died either in action in World War II or in active military service, leaving him the sole heir to the family’s fortune. In 1945, his mother remarried to American journalist and diplomat Herbert Agar

The family owned homes in Mayfair, London and “Beechwood”, near Petworth, Sussex. He was educated at Millfield School in Somerset and at Eton. He then worked in a Reading aircraft factory and became a private in the army. He attended University College Oxford, studying Politics, Philosophy and Economics and for a year was president of the Bullingdon club.

== Career ==
Following university, Wallace joined merchant bank Robert Benson Lonsdale and Co. He left in 1953 to work for Silver City Airways as a customer enquires counter clerk, after walking in and asking for a job, explaining that meeting people was more important to him than figures in a ledger. He was later promoted to personal assistant to the chairman.

He was involved in fundraising for the charity Invalid Children’s Aid Association, which included organising charity dances at the Savoy Hotel and the socialite amateur theatre productions Lord and Lady Algy and The Frog (the latter of which audience member Noël Coward described as "one of the most fascinating exhibitions of incompetence, conceit and bloody impertinence that I have ever seen in my life").

In the 1960s, Wallace turned to a career in cattle farming, specialising in breeding Herefordshire bulls.

Wallace suffered from bouts of ill health throughout his life. There were unspecified liver and kidney ailments which led to increasingly frequent hospitalisations.

== Fame ==
Wallace came to prominence in the early 1950s due to his association with Princess Margaret and as a mainstay of the group of young socialites known as the "Margaret Set."

Known for “charm that pops like a champagne cork”, the press chronicled his appearances at nightclubs, balls, race meetings and polo matches. He developed a diplomatic repartee with the press, supplying them with quips and deflecting rumours about his private life.

His dates with a variety of starlets of the time were covered, including actress Kay Kendall, models Fiona Campbell-Walter and Charlotte Bergsoe and actress Suzy Parker.

He was also sometimes linked romantically with his fellow Margaret Set friend Judy Montagu.

The press dubbed these purported romances the “Wallace Collection” after a museum in London. In 1952 it was rumoured he was engaged to Kendall and her biography noted that she had “entertained matrimonial thoughts” about him. He was also engaged to actress Sue Lloyd. The most frequent of such speculation concerned the likelihood of an engagement with Princess Margaret, which arose intermittently throughout the 1950s.

As her male companions married and Wallace was still seen accompanying Margaret, the press nicknamed him her “Old Faithful.”

== Relationship with Princess Margaret ==
Wallace and Margaret knew each other from childhood. They socialised regularly in the late 1940s and were first linked romantically by the press in 1949, when Margaret twice stayed with his family in Sussex.

At first Wallace’s name was inconspicuous among a long list of hypothesised suitors, gradually gaining prominence. When she extended a stay at his Sussex home in 1951, expectation of an engagement between them escalated during run up to her 21st birthday at Balmoral.

It was reported how he had been her constant escort at private parties and at all that season’s major events and she was a frequent guest at his homes After departing Balmoral, Wallace rebuked the press for "idiotic" stories. Engagement rumours were curtailed, but his reputation as her "favourite boy-friend" continued, petering out in late 1951, amid reports of the King's disapproval of his “man about town habits”.

In May 1952 Wallace told reporters he was "left on the shelf", and despite not being seen regularly with Margaret, he had become a media figure in own right. During 1954 Wallace and Margaret were reported together at various events. In July, press attention transferred to their friend Colin Tennant who claimed Margaret's relationship with Wallace had gone off the boil. In November, Wallace had resumed his repute as her "most talked about escort".

In April 1955, NBC's London news chief gave a report saying royal sources had told him Margaret would marry Wallace instead of Peter Townsend, whose relationship with her was now the subject of intense media speculation. Wallace equivocated, then later denied it. Such contradictions quietly persisted as he was by far her most frequent escort. After the Townsend affair was over, focus turned to Wallace in 1956.

Anticipation, mostly from America, that he would become Margaret’s husband continued until the spring, and faded around the time he failed to attend Tennant's wedding after he and Margaret had both accepted invitations. Press stories then alternated with other supposed marriage candidates, mainly Christopher Loyd.

In early July, she and Australia cricket captain Keith Miller were guests at Broadlands, the home of Louis Mountbatten. Miller eventually denied a long- rumoured romance with Margaret, saying "her boyfriend, Billy Wallace was there all the time".

The following week Townsend returned to the UK, preparing for a tour around the world, during which time he, Wallace and Margaret attended a country weekend. Reports after this time noted a cooling of the relationship with Wallace, who was now no longer seen with her and instead spent the summer overseas. They were described as apparently reunited after her return in autumn 1956 from an official tour abroad, and thereafter were often reported at functions together.

In April 1957 firm denials were given out against speculation they would marry. During the Royal Ascot horserace event in June, there was much press commentary linking Margaret with Lord Patrick Beresford, which died away after Beresford dismissed any involvement. Wallace and Margaret's frequent association continued and that autumn, 1957, Wallace was a guest at Balmoral.

During his stay, the Daily Sketch reported Wallace and Margaret were engaged, and it was to be announced officially the following spring. Wallace denied the report. He stayed with the royal family at Sandringham over Christmas, but was not reported with Margaret for some time after, and Margaret was noted to hardly seen in public or private at the turn of the year.

She returned to London in February 1958, where she reputedly met future husband Antony Armstrong-Jones at a dinner party. At that time, Wallace took a months’ vacation in Nassau, Bahamas as part of long-term sick leave. Shortly after his return in March, he was accused of having had a holiday romance. His denial appeared in the press on the 26th, but the story was side-lined by Townsend returning from his world trip on the same day and visiting Margaret at Clarence House.

At Balmoral in autumn 1958, Wallace was once again in public with Margaret, and he socialised more with her as his health progressed.

Marriage rumours revived for the final time in summer 1959. A friend denied to the press they were engaged, saying they had had a relationship when they were teenagers, but it “wore out”

In February 1960, the engagement of Margaret to society photographer Armstrong-Jones was announced.

Reports about Wallace credited him with being one of the few who knew of the relationship and ensured its secrecy. Wallace said he was leaving London for a rural life, but shouldn’t be thought of as the disappointed lover, however, he lingered on London social scene for a few more years, sometimes being reported with newlyweds on joint dates. His poor health persisted, and he left the scene permanently around 1963. Margaret was a guest at his wedding in 1965, and they remained lifelong friends.

A few months after Wallace had died, Margaret took part in an interview with Nigel Dempster, which disclosed their engagement. A friend was quoted as saying: "Billy was endlessly ambitious"... ""He must have asked Princess Margaret 1,000 times to marry him". According to Wallace, Margaret did finally agree to marry him and they were for a few months unofficially engaged. "But then Billy did a stupid thing. He went off to Nassau and had a brief meaningless fling. He was very arrogant and told Princess Margaret about Nassau. Naturally she was furious. She threw him out and didn't speak to him for at least three years" In April 1956, as if to highlight Margaret's isolation, Colin Tennant married Lady Anne Coke." A biography by Dempster from 1981 used similar quotes, relating that the engagement occurred around the time Townsend prepared for his world trip and placing the Bahamas vacation in 1957. Neither of these accounts correspond with original reporting, but by that time Wallace was a forgotten figure.

Biographies by Noel Botham released in 1994 and 2002 contained quotes from Wallace apparently referring to the engagement: "The thing with Townsend was a girlish nonsense that got out of hand. It was never the big thing on her part that people claim. I had my chance and blew it with my big mouth; or she would have become Mrs Wallace and I would have been able to handle her."

== Later life and death ==
Wallace purchased Bagnor Manor, Berkshire in 1960 and began a new career in farming, with some success in breeding Hereford cattle. He married the Hon. Elizabeth Anne Hoyer Millar, daughter of The 1st Baron Inchyra and Anna de Marees van Swinderen (the daughter of Dutch diplomat René de Marees van Swinderen), in 1965. They had no children.

They relocated to Egbury Manor, Wiltshire in 1975. He battled cancer of the jaw and mouth and died on 4 February 1977, three days before his 50th birthday.
