= Christopher Steel (diplomat) =

British diplomat (1903–1973)

Sir Christopher Eden Steel GCMG MVO (12 February 1903 – 17 September 1973) was a British diplomat who was permanent representative to NATO and ambassador to West Germany.

== Career ==
Christopher Steel was educated at Wellington College and Hertford College, Oxford (he held scholarships at both) and entered the Diplomatic Service in 1927. He served at Rio de Janeiro, Paris, The Hague, Berlin and Cairo. For a year in 1935–36 he was assistant private secretary to the Prince of Wales. He was British political officer at SHAEF 1945–47, political adviser to the British Commander-in-Chief, Germany, 1947–49 and deputy British High Commissioner, Germany, 1949–50. He was Minister (deputy head of mission) at the British Embassy, Washington, D.C., 1950–53, UK Permanent Representative on the North Atlantic Council 1953–57 and Ambassador to West Germany 1957–63. He retired from the Diplomatic Service in 1963 and was chairman of the Anglo-German Association 1966–73.

He was held in high admiration by many foreigners and particularly by the Germans, among whom he spent a major part of his career, for the accuracy with which he corresponded to the conventional image of an Englishman: his tall military figure, his ruddy complexion and neat moustache, his skill as a shot, fisherman and golfer, and his straightforward and occasionally outspoken manner. He also inspired deep affection among those who knew the warmth of hs friendship, his charm as a host and his kindly but firm leadership as a Head of Mission.
— Sir Denis Greenhill

== Honours ==
Christopher Steel was appointed MVO in the King's Birthday Honours of 1936 and CMG in the King's Birthday Honours of 1946. He was knighted KCMG in the King's Birthday Honours of 1951 and promoted to GCMG in the 1960 New Year Honours.

== Offices held ==
Diplomatic posts
Preceded by Sir Frederick Hoyer Millar	Permanent Representative to the North Atlantic Council; 1953–1957	Succeeded by Sir Frank Roberts
Preceded by Sir Frederick Hoyer Millar	Ambassador Extraordinary and Plenipotentiary at Bonn; 1957–1963	Succeeded by Sir Frank Roberts
