= King of Arms of the Order of St Michael and St George =

The King of Arms of the Order of St Michael and St George is the herald of the Order of St Michael and St George.

== Kings of Arms ==
Name	Dates	Ref.
Sir George Nayler, KH	1818–1831	
Sir George Nayler, GCMG, KH	1832	
Sir Charles Douglas	1832–1859	
The Rt. Hon. Sir Henry Wolff, KCMG	1859–1869	
Sir Albert Woods, GCVO, KCB, KCMG	1869–1904	
Vacant	1904–1909	
Captain Sir Montagu Ommanney, GCMG, KCB, ISO	1909–1924	
Sir Frank Swettenham, GCMG, CH	1925–1938	
Sir Archibald Weigall, Bt, KCMG	1938–1952	
Sir Nevile Bland, KCMG, KCVO	1952–1961	
The Rt. Hon.The 1st Lord Inchyra, GCMG, CVO	1961–1975	
The Rt. Hon. The Lord Saint Brides, GCMG, CVO, MBE, PC	1975–1987	
Lieutenant Commander Sir Oliver Wright, GCMG, GCVO, DSC	1987–1996	
Sir Ewen Fergusson, GCMG, GCVO	1996–2007	
Sir Jeremy Greenstock, GCMG	2007–2019	
The Rt. Hon. The Baroness Ashton of Upholland, LG, GCMG, PC	2019–2022	
Sir Mark Lyall Grant, GCMG	2022–present	
