= Edwin Montagu =

British politician (1879–1924)

The Right Honourable Edwin Montagu
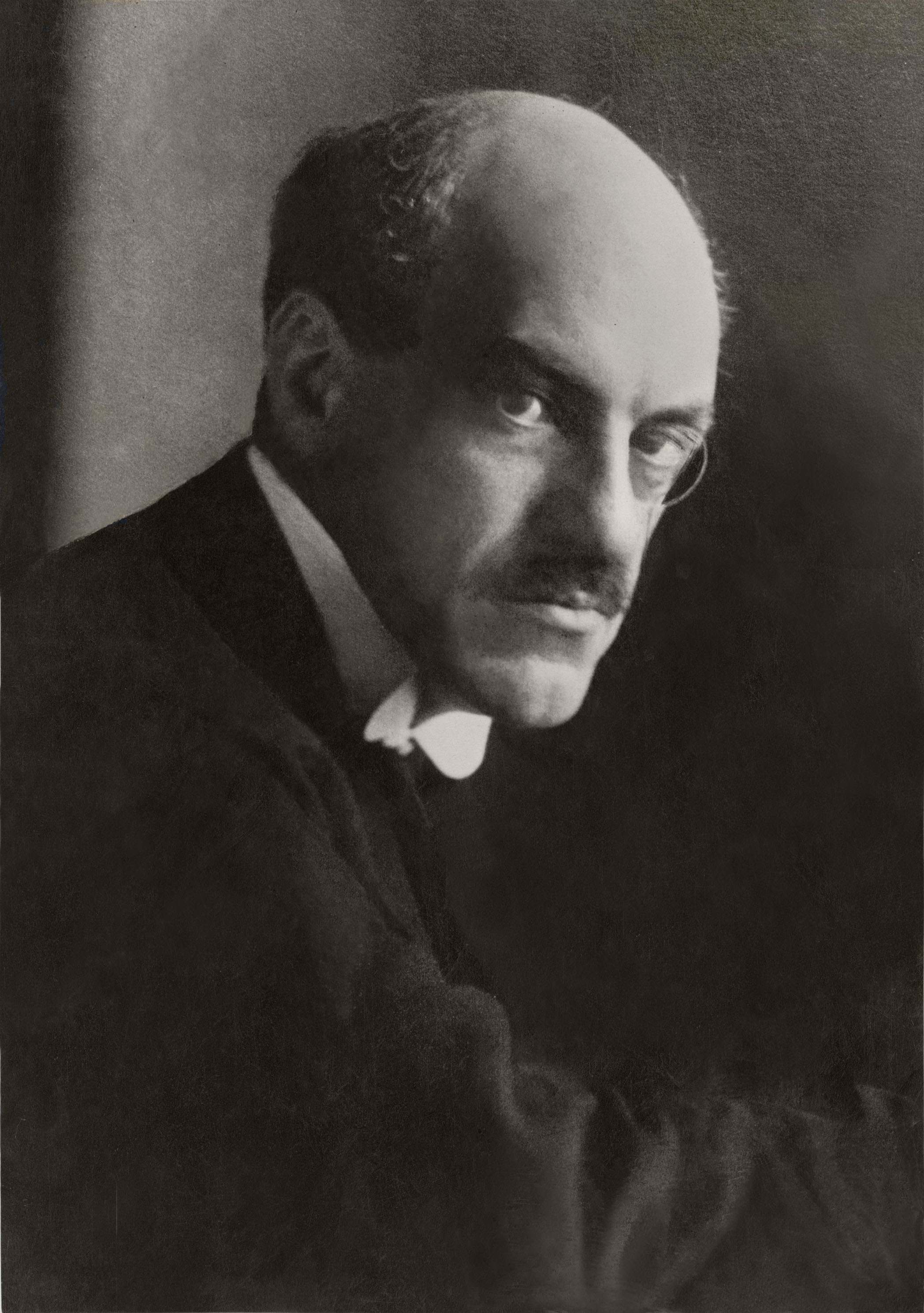

Secretary of State for India
- In office 17 July 1917 – 19 March 1922
- Prime Minister: David Lloyd George
- Preceded by: Austen Chamberlain
- Succeeded by: The Viscount Peel

Minister of Munitions
- In office 9 July 1916 – 10 December 1916
- Prime Minister: H. H. Asquith
- Preceded by: David Lloyd George
- Succeeded by: Christopher Addison

Chancellor of the Duchy of Lancaster
- In office 11 January 1916 – 9 July 1916
- Prime Minister: H. H. Asquith
- Preceded by: Herbert Samuel
- Succeeded by: Thomas McKinnon Wood
- In office 3 February 1915 – 25 May 1915
- Prime Minister: H. H. Asquith
- Preceded by: Charles Masterman
- Succeeded by: Winston Churchill

Financial Secretary to the Treasury
- In office 25 May 1915 – 11 January 1916
- Prime Minister: H. H. Asquith
- Preceded by: Francis Dyke Acland
- Succeeded by: Thomas McKinnon Wood
- In office 11 February 1914 – 3 February 1915
- Prime Minister: H. H. Asquith
- Preceded by: Charles Masterman
- Succeeded by: Francis Dyke Acland

Parliamentary Under-Secretary of State for India
- In office 20 February 1910 – 17 February 1914
- Prime Minister: H. H. Asquith
- Preceded by: Alexander Murray
- Succeeded by: Charles Roberts

Member of Parliament for Cambridgeshire Chesterton (1906–1918)
- In office 8 February 1906 – 15 November 1922
- Preceded by: Raymond Greene
- Succeeded by: Harold Gray

Personal details
- Born: Edwin Samuel Montagu; 6 February 1879
- Died: 15 November 1924 (aged 45)
- Party: Liberal (Before 1916, 1923–1924)
- Other political affiliations: Coalition Liberal (1916–1922); National Liberal (1922–1923)
- Spouse(s): Venetia Stanley (1887–1948)
- Children: Judith Venetia Montagu (daughter)
- Parents: Samuel Montagu, 1st Baron Swaythling (father); Ellen Cohen (mother)
- Education: University College London; Trinity College, Cambridge

Edwin Samuel Montagu PC (6 February 1879 – 15 November 1924) was a British Liberal politician who served as Secretary of State for India between 1917 and 1922. Montagu was a "radical" Liberal and the third practising Jew (after Sir Herbert Samuel and Sir Rufus Isaacs) to serve in the British cabinet.

He was primarily responsible for the Montagu–Chelmsford Reforms which led to the Government of India Act 1919, committing the British to the eventual evolution of India towards dominion status.

== Early life and career ==
Montagu was the second son and sixth child of Samuel Montagu, 1st Baron Swaythling, by his wife Ellen, daughter of Louis Cohen. He was educated at Doreck College, Clifton College, the City of London School, University College London and Trinity College, Cambridge. At Cambridge, he was the first student president of the Cambridge University Liberal Club from 1902 to 1903. In 1902, he was also president of the Cambridge Union.

== Political career ==
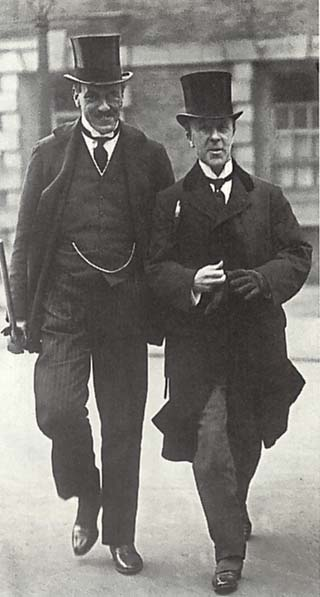
Edwin Montagu (left), Under-Secretary of State for India, with Reginald McKenna in 1911.

Montagu was elected Member of Parliament for Chesterton in 1906, a seat he held until 1918, and then represented Cambridgeshire until 1922. He served under H. H. Asquith as Under-Secretary of State for India from 1910 to 1914, as Financial Secretary to the Treasury from 1914 to 1915 and again from 1915 to 1916 and as Chancellor of the Duchy of Lancaster (with a seat in the Cabinet) in 1915 and 1916. In 1915 he was sworn of the Privy Council. In 1916 he was promoted to Minister of Munitions.

Montagu was a friend of Asquith, Gertrude Bell, Lord Lloyd, Maurice Hankey and Duff Cooper, with whom he dined frequently. When Hankey was promoted to the newly created post of Cabinet Secretary, he recommended Montagu as Minister for National Service, for which he was considered in December 1916 (the job was given in the end to Neville Chamberlain). Instead he was initially left out of David Lloyd George's coalition government in December 1916, but in August 1917 he was appointed Secretary of State for India. Montagu was not initially part of Lloyd George's inner circle, when he became Prime Minister, but he remained in office until his resignation in March 1922.

As Secretary of State, Montagu represented the interests of the British Empire and opposed the most strident Indian nationalists, calling S. Subramania Iyer the "Grand old man of South India." Montagu led the Indian delegation at the Paris Peace Conference in 1919, where, out of concern about antagonising Indian Muslim opinion, he opposed plans for dividing Turkey (including the Greek occupation of Smyrna and the projected removal of the Sultan from Constantinople). On this subject, at the Council of Four on 17 May 1919, he introduced representatives of Muslim India (including the Aga Khan) and urged that Muslim peoples were beginning to see the Conference as "taking sides against Islam".

He was primarily responsible for the Montagu–Chelmsford Reforms which led to the Government of India Act 1919, committing the British to the eventual evolution of India towards dominion status.

== Anti-Zionism ==
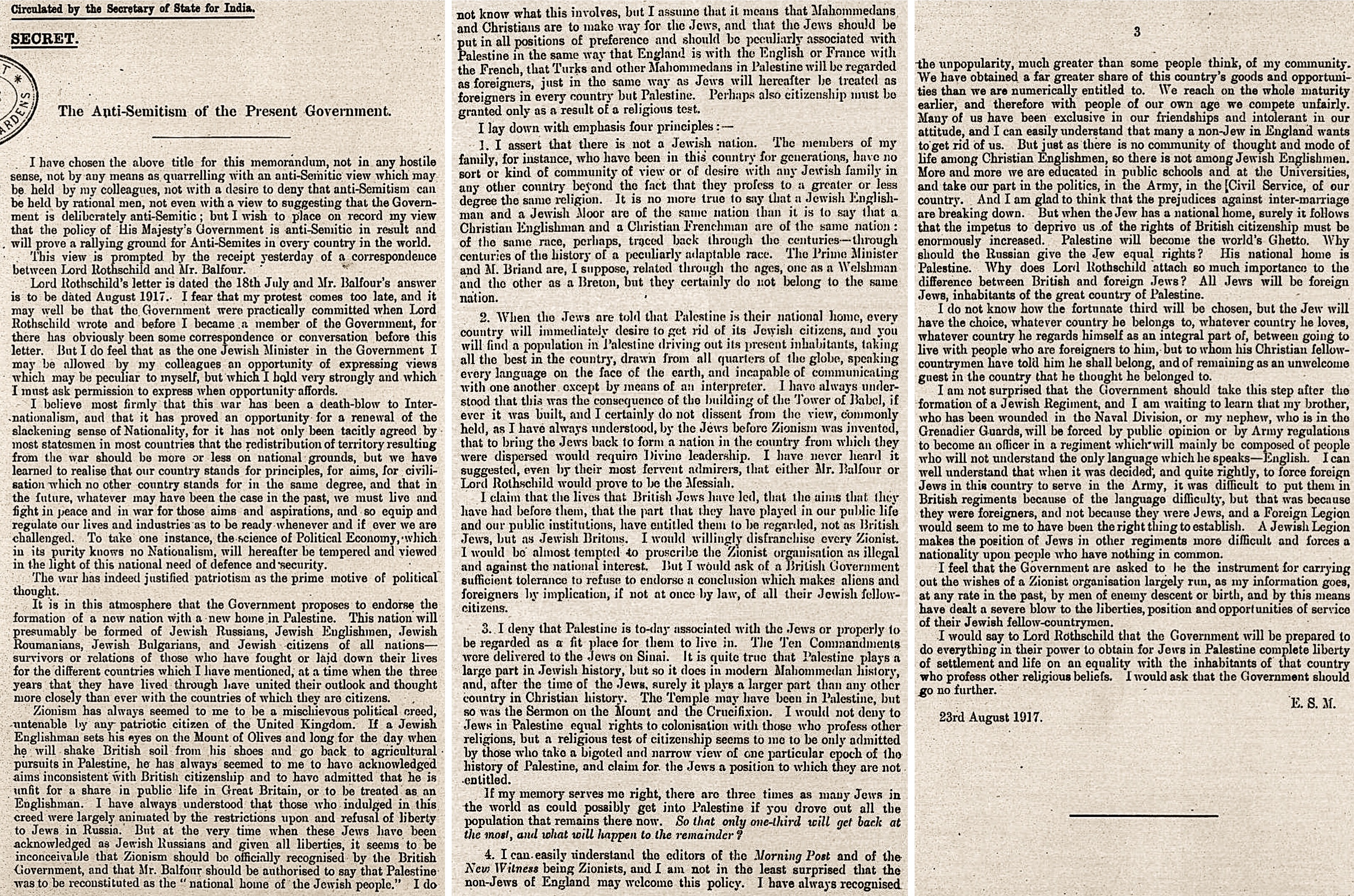
The August 1917 memorandum by Edwin Montagu, the only Jew then in a senior British government position, stating his opposition to the pro-Zionist Balfour Declaration, and that he viewed it as antisemitic

Despite his father's active support for the cause, Montagu was strongly opposed to Zionism, which he called "a mischievous political creed", and opposed the Balfour Declaration of 1917, which he considered anti-Semitic and whose terms he managed to modify. In a memo to the Cabinet, he outlined his views on Zionism:

...I assume that it means that Mahommedans [Muslims] and Christians are to make way for the Jews and that the Jews should be put in all positions of preference and should be peculiarly associated with Palestine in the same way that England is with the English or France with the French, that Turks and other Mahommedans in Palestine will be regarded as foreigners, just in the same way as Jews will hereafter be treated as foreigners in every country but Palestine. Perhaps also citizenship must be granted only as a result of a religious test.

He was opposed by his cousin Herbert Samuel, a moderate Zionist, who became the first High Commissioner of the British Mandate of Palestine. Edwin Montagu cooperated with the anti-Zionist architect Ernest Tatham Richmond and significantly supported Richmond's study on the Dome of the Rock.

== Personal life & death ==
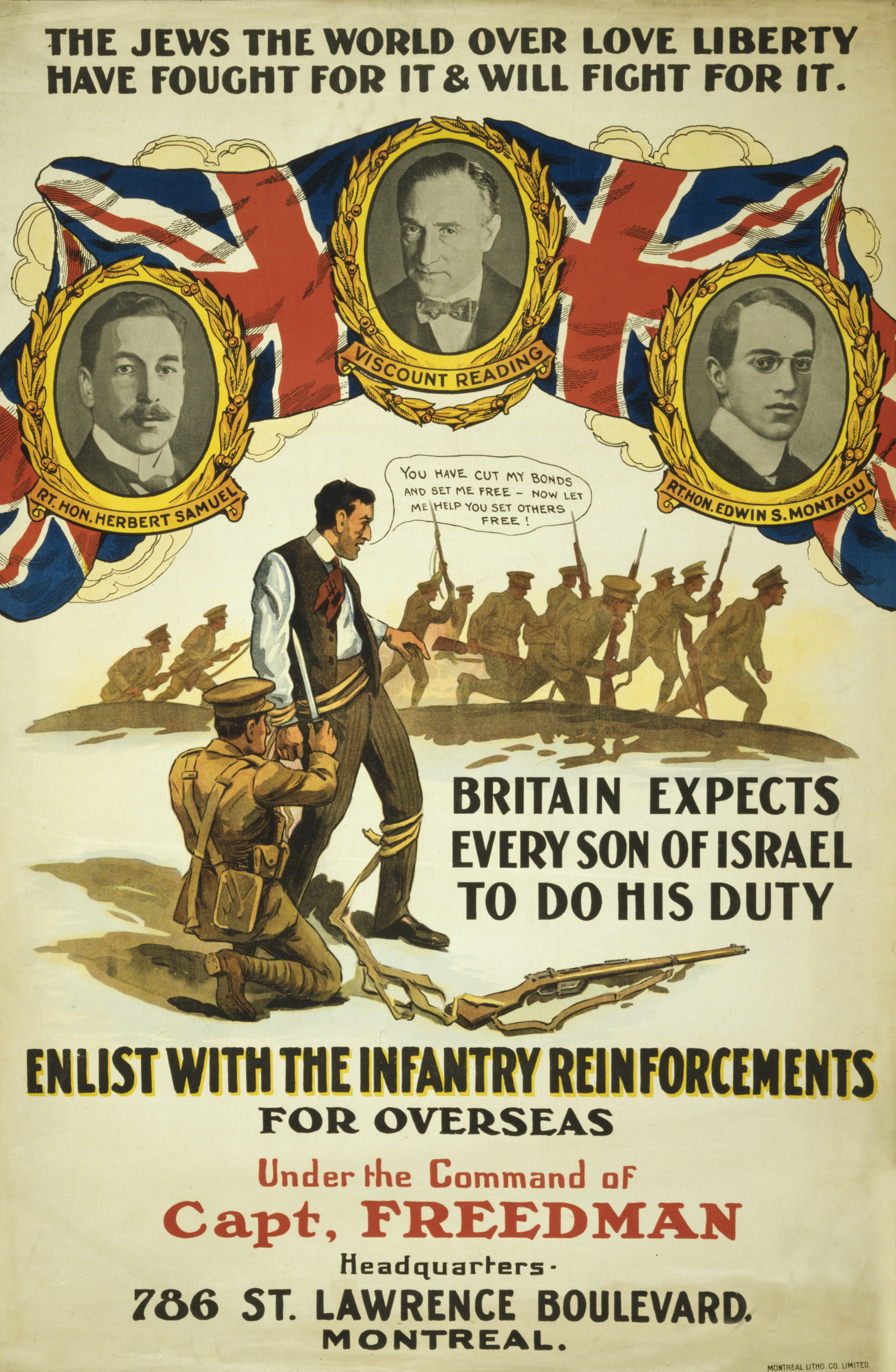
World War I enlistment poster from Canada, with Jewish members of the British parliament, Montagu (extreme right).

In 1912, Montagu accompanied the prime minister on holiday in Sicily. H. H. Asquith brought along his daughter Violet, and she in turn brought her friend Venetia Stanley, daughter of Edward Stanley, 4th Baron Stanley of Alderley. It appears that during this holiday, both men fell in love with Stanley.

During the next three years Asquith wrote more and more frequently to her, even during Cabinet meetings. At the same time, Montagu was attempting to court her, unsuccessfully proposing marriage in 1913. She liked him but did not reciprocate his love. Also, Montagu had to marry within his Jewish faith to keep his inheritance. Although Stanley was from a freethinking family and was not a devout Anglican, conversion to Judaism seemed too great a barrier. However, Asquith's epistolary obsession with Venetia and his constant demands for advice apparently became overwhelming even for this intelligent and well-read woman, keenly interested in politics as she was. As a result, she finally accepted Montagu's proposal on 28 April 1915. She converted to Judaism, and the couple were wed on 26 July 1915.

In 1923 a child was born, Judith Venetia Montagu. She grew up to befriend Princess Margaret during World War II and marry the American photographer Milton Gendel, with whom she created an artistic salon in Italy. They had one child, Anna Mathias (née Gendel), the god-daughter of Princess Margaret.

Despite his wife's affairs, Montagu's marriage lasted until his death in 1924. The cause of his physical deterioration and death at the age of 45 was unknown, but was thought to be either blood poisoning or encephalitis.

== In popular culture ==
Montagu is a central character in Robert Harris's 2024 novel Precipice, which depicts his friendship with, and eventual marriage to, Venetia Stanley.

== See also ==
- Liberalism in the United Kingdom

== Works ==
- An Indian Diary (1930)

Parliament of the United Kingdom
Preceded by Walter Raymond Greene	Member of Parliament for Chesterton; 1906–1918	Constituency abolished
New constituency	Member of Parliament for Cambridgeshire; 1918–1922	Succeeded by Harold Stannus Gray
Political offices
Preceded by The Master of Elibank	Under-Secretary of State for India; 1910–1914	Succeeded by Charles Henry Roberts
Preceded by Charles Masterman	Financial Secretary to the Treasury; 1914–1915	Succeeded by Francis Dyke Acland
Preceded by Charles Masterman	Chancellor of the Duchy of Lancaster; 1915	Succeeded by Winston Churchill
Preceded by Francis Dyke Acland	Financial Secretary to the Treasury; 1915–1916	Succeeded by Thomas McKinnon Wood
Preceded by Herbert Samuel	Chancellor of the Duchy of Lancaster; 1916	Succeeded by Thomas McKinnon Wood
Preceded by David Lloyd George	Minister of Munitions; 1916	Succeeded by Christopher Addison
Preceded by Austen Chamberlain	Secretary of State for India; 1917-1922	Succeeded by The Viscount Peel
