= Milton Gendel =

American photographer and art critic (1918–2018)

Milton Gendel (December 16, 1918 – October 11, 2018) was an American photographer and art critic who worked for most of his career in Italy.

== Biography ==
Gendel was born in New York City in December 1918 but lived in Rome from 1949. As a correspondent for ARTnews, he wrote articles about Italian artists such as Alberto Burri and Toti Scialoja. Gendel's photographs capture artists and intellectuals against the background of the transformation of Italy during the postwar economic boom. He was an associate of André Breton during his time in New York. In 1945-46, while stationed in China with the United States Army, he captured the tumultuous period between the Japanese surrender and the advent of civil war that brought the Communists to power.

Gendel's work was the subject of dual retrospective exhibitions at the Museo Carlo Bilotti and the American Academy in Rome in 2011. He had his first American exhibition in New York in 2008. Photographs and diaries from Gendel's time in Rome were published in the 2022 book Just Passing Through: A Seven-Decade Roman Holiday, edited by Cullen Murphy.

Gendel died in Rome in October 2018, two months shy of his 100th birthday. He had married Judith Venetia (1923–1972), daughter of politician Edwin Montagu and Venetia, daughter of Edward Stanley, 4th Baron Stanley of Alderley, in 1962; they had a daughter, Anna, whose godmother was Princess Margaret, Countess of Snowdon.
