= 2002 Demise Honours =

British government recognitions

A list of Honours was released on 5 August 2002, and made appointments and promotions within the Royal Victorian Order, as well as awards of the Royal Victorian Medal, on the demise of Queen Elizabeth The Queen Mother and Princess Margaret, Countess of Snowdon, in 2002. The Royal Victorian Order is a dynastic order of knighthood recognising distinguished personal service to the Sovereign, and remains in the personal gift of the monarch.

== Knight Grand Cross of the Royal Victorian Order (GCVO) ==
- The Right Honourable Robert Alexander Lindsay, The Earl of Crawford and Balcarres, KT, formerly Lord Chamberlain to Queen Elizabeth The Queen Mother.

== Commanders of the Royal Victorian Order (CVO) ==
- The Honourable Nicholas Assheton, formerly Treasurer and Extra Equerry to Queen Elizabeth The Queen Mother.
- Annabel Alice Hoyer, The Honourable Mrs. Whitehead, LVO, formerly Lady in Waiting to The Princess Margaret, Countess of Snowdon.

== Lieutenants of the Royal Victorian Order (LVO) ==
- Jennifer Susan, Mrs. Gordon-Lennox, formerly Lady in Waiting to Queen Elizabeth The Queen Mother.
- Catriona Bridget, Mrs. Leslie, formerly Lady in Waiting to Queen Elizabeth The Queen Mother.
- Prudence Hilary, Lady Penn, formerly Lady in Waiting to Queen Elizabeth The Queen Mother.
- Captain Charles Raymond Radclyffe. For equestrian services to Queen Elizabeth The Queen Mother.
- Elizabeth Anne, The Countess of Scarbrough, formerly Lady in Waiting to Queen Elizabeth The Queen Mother.
- Nicholas James Christopher Lowther, The Viscount Ullswater, formerly Private Secretary to The Princess Margaret, Countess of Snowdon.

== Members of the Royal Victorian Order (MVO) ==
- Captain Robin John Batson, King's Troop, Royal Horse Artillery; Gun Carriage Party, Funeral of Queen Elizabeth The Queen Mother.
- Warrant Officer Class 1 Leonard Gary Evans, The King's Troop, Royal Horse Artillery; Gun Carriage Party, Funeral of Queen Elizabeth The Queen Mother.
- Warrant Officer Class 2 Stephen Anthony Evans, The King's Troop, Royal Horse Artillery; Gun Carriage Party, Funeral of Queen Elizabeth The Queen Mother.
- Captain Mark Patrick Munro Grayson, formerly Temporary Equerry to Queen Elizabeth The Queen Mother.
- Warrant Officer Class 2 Christopher James Oswald, Irish Guards; Bearer Party, Funeral of Queen Elizabeth The Queen Mother.
- Captain Fabian Andrew David Lechmere Roberts, Irish Guards; Bearer Party, Funeral of Queen Elizabeth The Queen Mother.

== Royal Victorian Medal (Silver) ==
- Guardsman Adam Azab, Irish Guards; Bearer Party, Funeral of Queen Elizabeth The Queen Mother.
- Christine Paula Byrne, formerly Housekeeper to the Household of The Princess Margaret, Countess of Snowdon.
- Lance Corporal Simon David Campbell, Irish Guards; Bearer Party, Funeral of Queen Elizabeth The Queen Mother.
- Leslie Edwin Chappell, formerly Page of the Presence to Queen Elizabeth The Queen Mother.
- Staff Sergeant Mark Edward Fisher, The King's Troop, Royal Horse Artillery; Gun Carriage Party, Funeral of Queen Elizabeth The Queen Mother.
- Guardsman Robert James Fleming, The King's Troop, Royal Horse Artillery; Gun Carriage Party, Funeral of Queen Elizabeth The Queen Mother.
- Guardsman Paul Steven Hewitt, Irish Guards; Bearer Party, Funeral of Queen Elizabeth The Queen Mother.
- Sergeant Christopher Dean Lloyd, The King's Troop, Royal Horse Artillery; Gun Carriage Party, Funeral of Queen Elizabeth The Queen Mother.
- Lance Corporal Thomas James Major, Irish Guards; Bearer Party, Funeral of Queen Elizabeth The Queen Mother.
- Jacqueline Meakin, formerly Senior Dresser to Queen Elizabeth The Queen Mother.
- Sandra Morgan, formerly Dresser to The Princess Margaret, Countess of Snowdon.
- Lance Corporal Gavin Patrick O'Neill, Irish Guards; Bearer Party, Funeral of Queen Elizabeth The Queen Mother.
- Lance Corporal John Joseph Organ, Irish Guards; Bearer Party, Funeral of Queen Elizabeth The Queen Mother.
- Lance Bombardier James Anthony Padury, The King's Troop, Royal Horse Artillery; Gun Carriage Party, Funeral of Queen Elizabeth The Queen Mother.
- Gunner Gemma Louise Stacey, The King's Troop, Royal Horse Artillery; Gun Carriage Party, Funeral of Queen Elizabeth The Queen Mother.
- Charles James Coulton Stewart, formerly Footman at Royal Lodge.
- Guardsman Andrew Charles Travis, Irish Guards; Bearer Party, Funeral of Queen Elizabeth The Queen Mother.
- Guardsman Matthew Edward Wall, Irish Guards; Bearer Party, Funeral of Queen Elizabeth The Queen Mother.
- Staff Sergeant Mark Watson, The King's Troop, Royal Horse Artillery; Gun Carriage Party, Funeral of Queen Elizabeth The Queen Mother.
- Lance Bombardier Matthew James Wright, The King's Troop, Royal Horse Artillery; Gun Carriage Party, Funeral of Queen Elizabeth The Queen Mother.
