= Simon Bland =

British army officer (1923–2022)

Lieutenant-Colonel Sir Simon Claud Michael Bland KCVO (4 December 1923 – 11 August 2022) was a British soldier and courtier.

Bland was born in London on 4 December 1923. The son of the diplomat Sir Nevile Bland, he served with the Scots Guards in the Second World War and during the Malaya Emergency and was the assistant military adviser to the High Commission in Karachi (1959–60). In 1961, he was appointed Assistant Private Secretary to Prince Henry, Duke of Gloucester; he then served as Comptroller and Private Secretary in his household from 1963 until the Duke's death in 1974, and was also Private Secretary to his eldest son, Prince William of Gloucester, from 1968 until the Prince's death in 1972. He subsequently served as Private Secretary, Comptroller and Equerry to Prince William's younger brother Richard (who became Duke of Gloucester in 1974) and to his mother Princess Alice, Duchess of Gloucester, until retirement in 1989.

Bland was appointed a Member (Fourth Class) of the Royal Victorian Order in the 1967 Birthday Honours, and was promoted twice, firstly to Commander in the 1973 Birthday Honours and then to Knight Commander in the 1982 Birthday Honours.

Bland died at home on 11 August 2022, at the age of 98. His funeral for which The Queen was represented by the Lady Elton, (Her Majesty’s Lady in Waiting) held on 8 September 2022, was the last official duty performed by The Queen; who died later that same day.
