= Permanent Under-Secretary of State for Foreign Affairs =

British civil servant position

Permanent Under Secretary of Foreign, Commonwealth & Development Affairs and Head of HM Diplomatic Service
- Royal arms as used by His Majesty's Government

- Incumbent; Lindy Cameron since 19 October 2026
- Foreign, Commonwealth and Development Office
- Reports to: Cabinet Secretary; Foreign Secretary
- Nominator: Cabinet Secretary
- Appointer: Prime Minister
- Inaugural holder: George Aust
- Formation: 1790

The Permanent Under Secretary of Foreign, Commonwealth and Development Affairs, sometimes known as the Permanent Secretary of the Foreign Office, is the most senior civil servant in the FCDO.

A former PUS, Sir William Strang, described the role as being "the Secretary of State's principal adviser on policy and … his principal agent for administration". And the UK government website, in reference to one of the former Permanent Under-Secretaries, Sir Simon Fraser, agrees, describing the role as "the senior policy advisor to the Foreign Secretary". Additionally, the PUS is the Head of the British Diplomatic Service. Furthermore, the office holder chairs the Royal Visits Committee which provides advice to the Prime Minister on whether to invite Heads of State.

This article contains a list of all permanent under-secretaries in the British Foreign, Commonwealth and Development Office (and its predecessors) since 1790.

From April to September 2026, the role was vacant after the dismissal of Sir Oliver Robbins by Prime Minister Sir Keir Starmer over the appointment of Peter Mandelson to the position of British Ambassador to the United States. In September 2026, Lindy Cameron was appointed to the role. Cameron is the first female permanent undersecretary.

== Permanent under-secretaries at the Foreign Office, 1790 to present ==
These are the permanent secretaries or senior civil servants at the Foreign Office.

- February 1790: George Aust
- October 1795: George Hammond (resigned 1806)
- March 1807: George Hammond
- October 1809: William Richard Hamilton
- July 1817: Joseph Planta
- April 1827: John Backhouse
- 1842: Henry Unwin Addington
- 1854: Edmund Hammond(later Lord Hammond)
- 1873: Charles Abbott, 3rd Baron Tenterden
- 1882: Sir Julian Pauncefote (later Lord Pauncefote)
- 1889: Sir Philip Currie (later Lord Currie)
- 1894: Sir Thomas Sanderson (later Lord Sanderson)
- 1906: Sir Charles Hardinge (later Lord Hardinge of Penshurst)
- 1910: Sir Arthur Nicolson (later Lord Carnock)
- 1916: Charles Hardinge, 1st Baron Hardinge of Penshurst
- 1920: Sir Eyre Crowe (died in office)
- 1925: Sir William Tyrrell (later Lord Tyrrell)
- 1928: Sir Ronald Lindsay
- 1930: Sir Robert Vansittart (later Lord Vansittart)
- 1938: Sir Alexander Cadogan
- 1946: Sir Orme Sargent (jointly with Sir William Strang, Head of the German Section 1947–1949)
- 1949: Sir William Strang (jointly with the Heads of the German Section: Sir Ivone Kirkpatrick 1949–1950, Sir D. Gainer 1950–1951) (later Lord Strang)
- 1953: Sir Ivone Kirkpatrick
- 1957: Sir Frederick Hoyer Millar (later Lord Inchyra)
- 1962: Sir Harold Caccia (later Lord Caccia)
- 1965: Sir Paul Gore-Booth (also Head of the Diplomatic Service from 1968; later Lord Gore-Booth)

Foreign Office became Foreign & Commonwealth Office in 1968

- 1969: Sir Denis Greenhill (later Lord Greenhill of Harrow)
- 1973: Sir Thomas Brimelow (later Lord Brimelow)
- 1975: Sir Michael Palliser
- 1982: Sir Antony Acland
- 1986: Sir Patrick Wright (later Lord Wright of Richmond)
- 1991: Sir David Gillmore (later Lord Gillmore of Thamesfield)
- 1994: Sir John Coles
- 1997: Sir John Kerr (later Lord Kerr of Kinlochard)
- 2002: Sir Michael Jay (later Lord Jay of Ewelme)
- 2006: Sir Peter Ricketts (later Lord Ricketts)
- 2010: Sir Simon Fraser
- 2015: Sir Simon McDonald (later Lord McDonald of Salford)

Foreign & Commonwealth Office became Foreign, Commonwealth, & Development Office in 2020

- 2020: Sir Philip Barton
- 2025: Sir Oliver Robbins
- 2026: Nick Dyer (interim)
- 2026: Lindy Cameron

== See also ==
- List of permanent under secretaries of state of the Home Office
- Undersecretary

== Referenced Publications ==
- Cromwell, V. (1960). An Incident in the Development of the Permanent under Secretaryship at the Foreign Office.
- Cromwell, V. and Steiner, Z. (1972). The Foreign Office before 1914. In: G. Sutherland, ed., Studies in the Growth of Nineteenth-Century Government. Routledge.Historical Research, 33(87), pp.99–113.
- McKercher, B.J.C. (2004). The Foreign Office, 1930–39: Strategy, Permanent Interests and National Security. Contemporary British History, 18(3), pp.87–109. doi:10.1080/1361946042000259323.
- Neilson, K. and Otte, T.G. (2009). The Permanent Under-secretary for Foreign Affairs, 1854-1946. Routledge.
- Steiner, Z. (1970). The Foreign Office and Foreign Policy, 1898-1914. CUP Archive.
- Yule-Smith, O. (2023). ‘A Supremely Good Chinovik’: William Strang, Europe, and the Role of the Official, 1919–1949. Diplomacy & Statecraft, 34(4), pp.619–650. 10.1080/09592296.2023.2270327.
