= Nevile Bland =

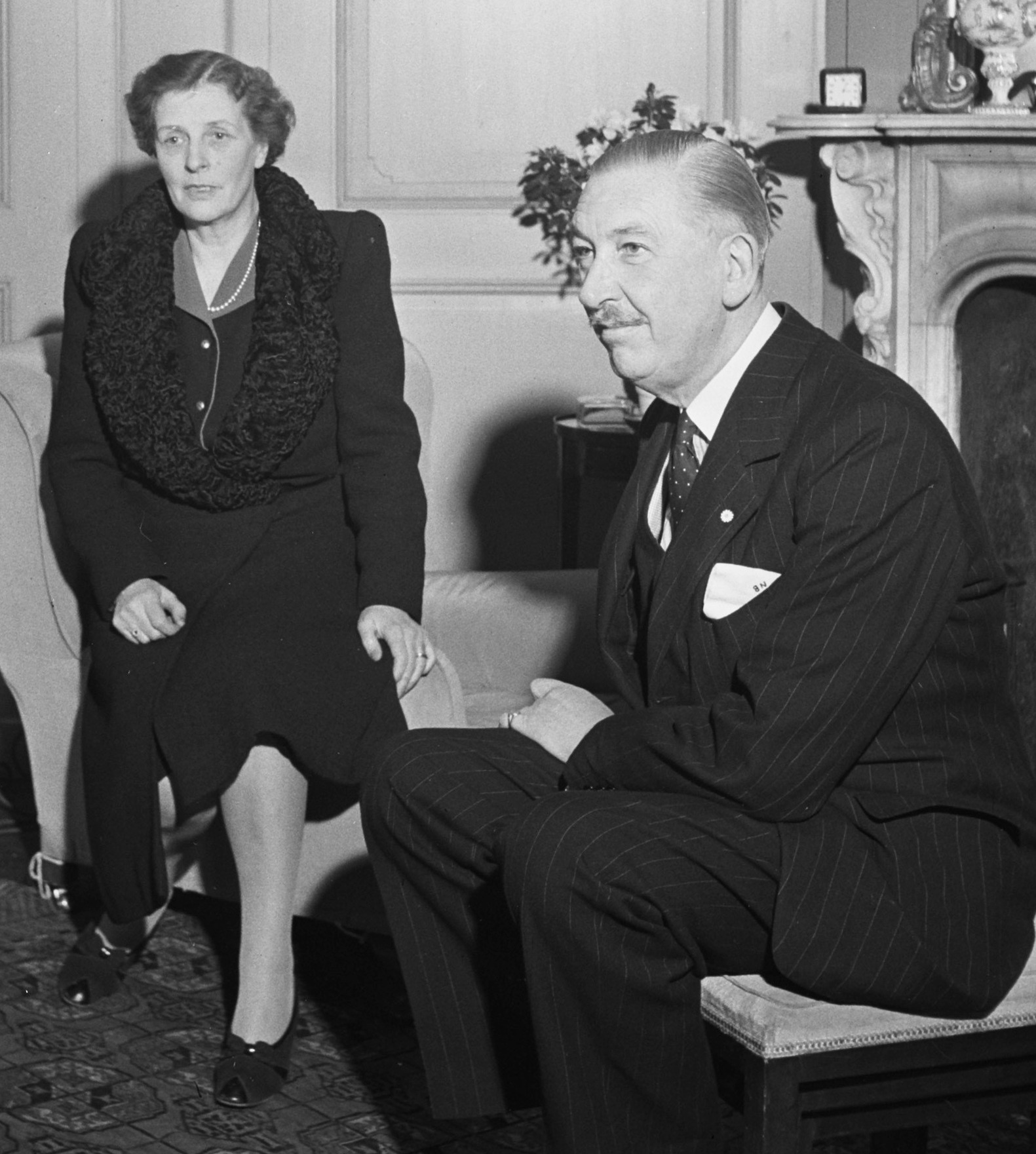
Sir Nevile Bland with Lady Bland at the Embassy of the United Kingdom, The Hague (January 6, 1946).

Sir George Nevile Maltby Bland KCMG KCVO (6 December 1886 – 19 August 1972) was a British diplomat who served as Envoy Extraordinary and Minister Plenipotentiary to the Netherlands from 1938 through the war years until 1948. He also authored or edited several legal books and articles.

== Early life ==
Bland was born the youngest son of Francis Maltby Bland, DL, JP, and his wife Edith Richenda Bland (née Barclay). His maternal uncle Sir George Barclay had been the British Minister in Bucharest during the First World War. His siblings included brothers Hugh Michael and Francis Lawrence Bland, and sisters Edith Richenda ("Chenda") and Esther. Bland was educated at Eton, and then at King's College, Cambridge, graduating with a BA degree in 1908, upgraded to MA in 1912. He entered the Diplomatic Service in 1911.

== Career ==
After a long spell serving as Private Secretary to various senior diplomats and then as Counsellor, Nevile Bland was knighted KCVO in the 1937 Coronation Honours. He was appointed Envoy Extraordinary and Minister Plenipotentiary to the Netherlands in 1938, and narrowly escaped internment by the Nazis by escaping in 1940. On his return to England, he was instrumental in creating at atmosphere of hostility toward anti-Nazi Germans who had fled Hitler through the 1930s, identifying them as dangerous “Fifth Columnists”, leading directly to their mass round-up, internment and deportation to the Dominions.

He remained with the Netherlands government in exile in England during the war, and then again in The Hague until March 1948 (his post was upgraded to Ambassador in 1942). From 1952 to 1961 he was King of Arms of the Order of St Michael and St George.

== Honours ==
- Companion of the Order of St Michael and St George, 1927 New Year Honours
- Knight Commander of the Royal Victorian Order, 1937
- Knight Commander of the Order of St Michael and St George, 1947
- Knight Grand Cross of the Order of Orange-Nassau, 1950
- King of Arms of the Order of St Michael and St George, 1952–1961

== Family ==
In 1919, Nevile Bland became engaged and then married Portia Ottley. They had at least three children, of whom a baby daughter Corinna died in late 1924, and a son David was killed in action in Tunisia in 1943. Another son, Simon, survived the Second World War and a spell of duty in British Malaya to marry and father children; he became private secretary, then equerry, to the Duke and Duchess of Gloucester and Princess Alice, Duchess of Gloucester.

== See also ==
- List of diplomats of the United Kingdom to the Netherlands

== Works edited ==
- A guide to diplomatic practice, edited by Nevile Bland

== Notes and references ==
Diplomatic posts
Preceded by Sir Hubert Montgomery	Envoy Extraordinary and Minister Plenipotentiary to Her Majesty the Queen of the Netherlands then Ambassador Extraordinary and Plenipotentiary to Her Majesty the Queen of the Netherlands; 1938–1948	Succeeded by Sir Philip Nichols
Heraldic offices
Preceded by Sir William Weigall	King of Arms of the Order of St Michael and St George; 1952–1962	Succeeded by The Lord Inchyra
