= Allied High Commission =

1949–1955 military governing body over West Germany

The Allied High Commission (also known as the High Commission for Occupied Germany, HICOG; in German Alliierte Hohe Kommission, AHK) was established by the United States, the United Kingdom, and France after the 1948 breakdown of the Allied Control Council, to regulate and supervise the development of the newly established Federal Republic of Germany (West Germany).

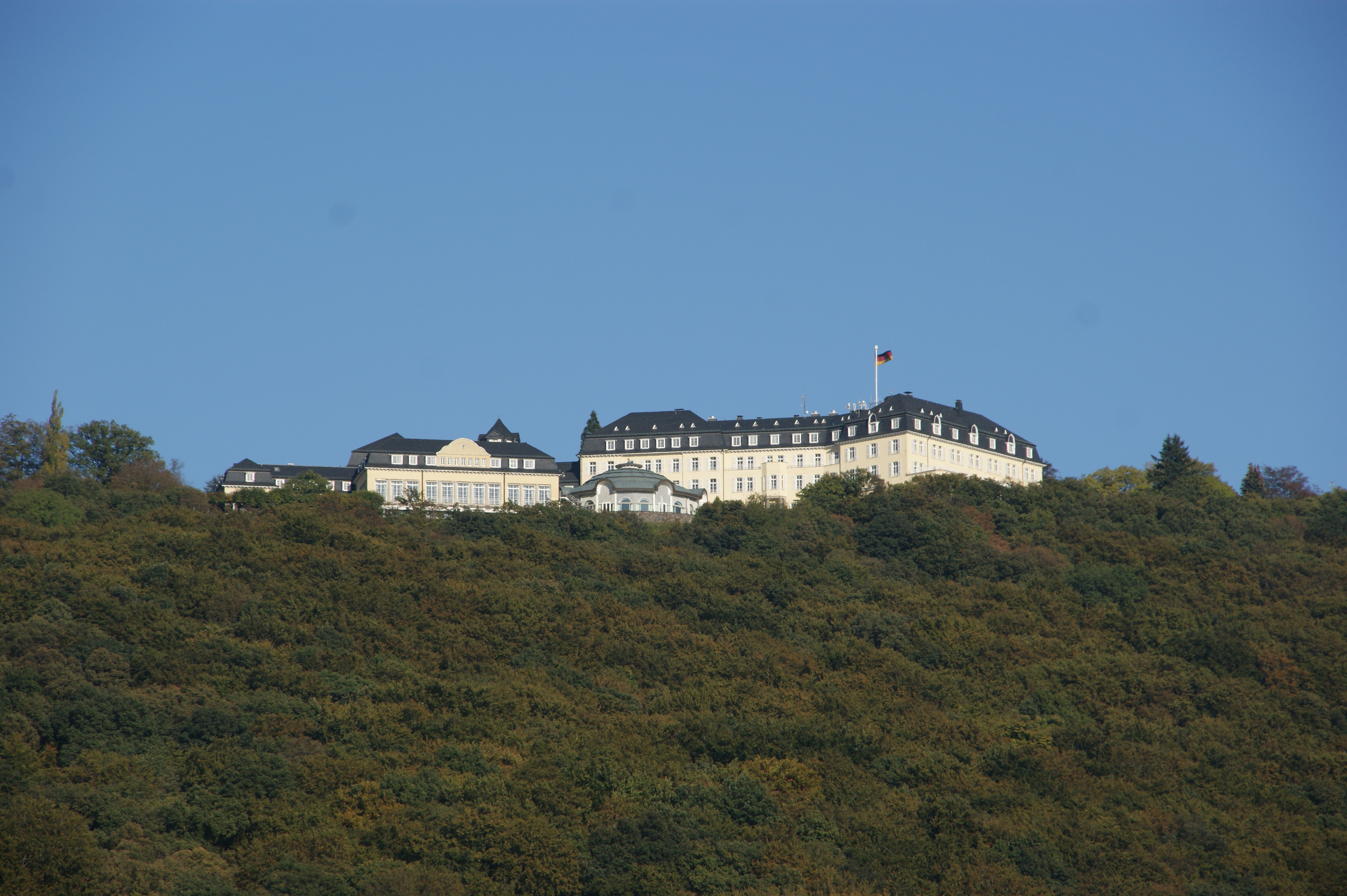
Hotel Petersberg, seat of the Commission

The Commission took its seat at the Hotel Petersberg near Bonn and started its work on September 21, 1949. It ceased to function under the terms of the Bonn–Paris conventions, on May 5, 1955.

The Occupation Statute specified the prerogatives of the Western Allies vis-à-vis the West German government, and preserved the right to intervene in areas of military, economic, and foreign policy importance. These rights were revised in the Petersberg Agreement several weeks later.

With the creation of the Federal Republic and the institution of the High Commission, the position of the Military Governors was abolished. Instead each of the three Western Allies named a High Commissioner.

== High commissioners ==
| Country | Name | Tenure |
|---|---|---|
| France | André François-Poncet | 21 September 1949 – 5 May 1955 |
| United Kingdom | Sir Brian Robertson | 21 September 1949 – 24 June 1950 |
| United Kingdom | Sir Ivone Kirkpatrick | 24 June 1950 – 29 September 1953 |
| United Kingdom | Sir Frederick Millar | 29 September 1953 – 5 May 1955 |
| United States | John J. McCloy | 2 September 1949 – 1 August 1952 |
| United States | Walter J. Donnelly | 1 August 1952 – 11 December 1952 |
| United States | Samuel Reber (acting) | 11 December 1952 – 10 February 1953 |
| United States | James Bryant Conant | 10 February 1953 – 5 May 1955 |

== See also ==
- Allied Occupation Zones in Germany
- History of Germany (1945–1990)
