= George Hammond (diplomat) =

British diplomat (1763–1853)

George Hammond FRGS
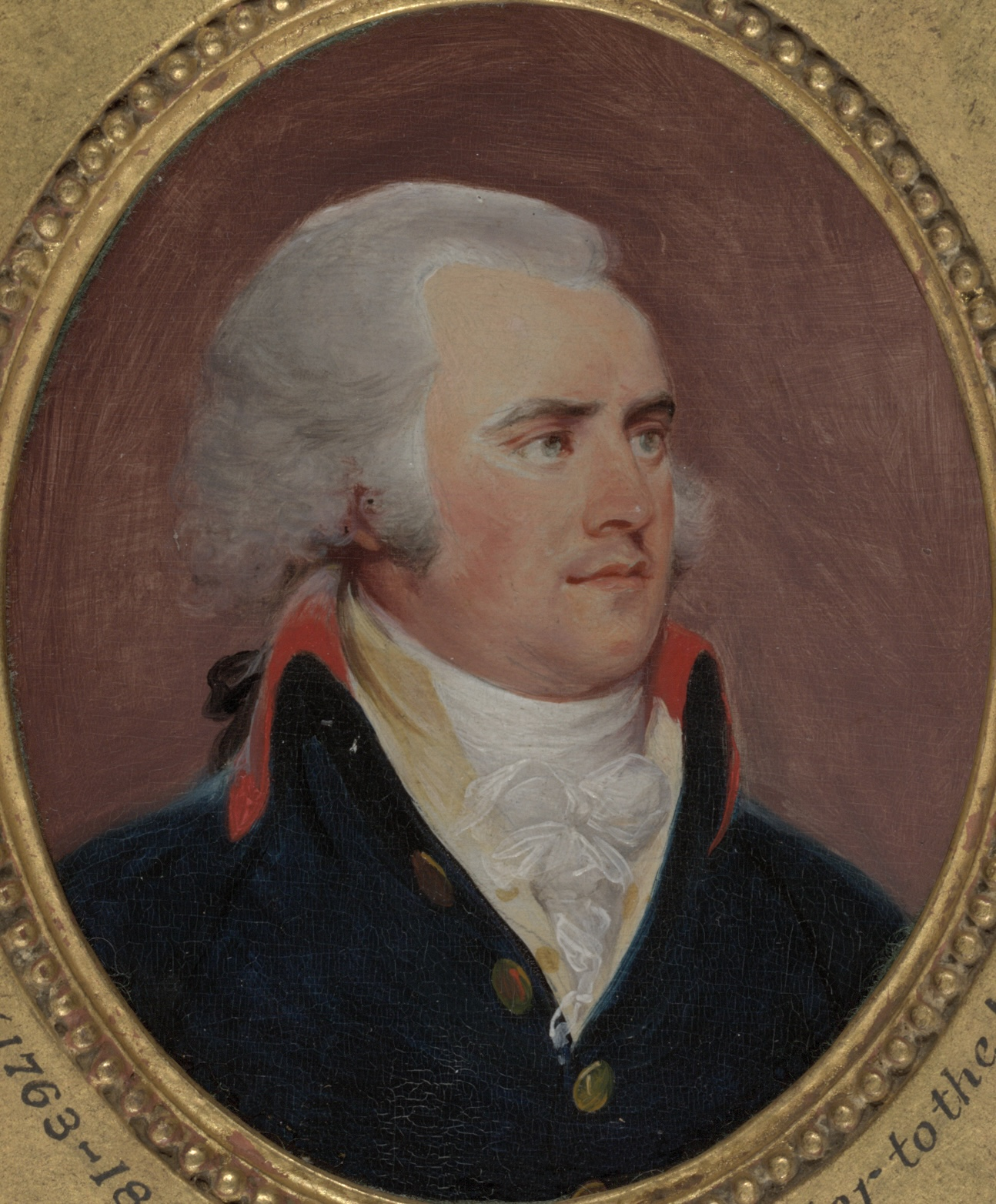
- Portrait miniature by John Trumbull, c. 1793

British Minister to the United States
- In office 1791–1795
- Preceded by: office established
- Succeeded by: Robert Liston

Personal details
- Born: 1763 East Riding of Yorkshire, England
- Died: 1853 (aged 89–90)
- Children: 4, including Edmund
- Education: Merton College, Oxford

George Hammond FRGS (1763–1853) was a British diplomat and one of the first British envoys to the United States from 1791 to 1795.

== Early career ==
Hammond was born in East Riding of Yorkshire, the son of William and Anne Hammond of Kirkella, and enjoyed a liberal education, and was a Master of Arts and Fellow of Merton College, Oxford. During the peace talks between the 13 colonies of the United States of America and the Kingdom of Great Britain that would culminate in the Treaty of Paris in 1783, he served as a Secretary to David Hartley; while in Paris, he also learned some French. Subsequently, Hammond was appointed chargé d'affaires at Vienna from 1788 to 1790, spent part of 1790 in Copenhagen, and in 1791 found himself Counsellor of Legation at Madrid.

== Minister to the United States ==
Despite American grumbles over the lack of a British envoy since the peace treaty concluded the American revolution in 1783, the decision for the British was by no means a simple one. The Articles of Confederation lacked both a fixed seat of government and single leader to accredit an envoy, and few qualified diplomats desired the post and its yearly salary of £2,500. David Hartley, himself approached for the position, recommended his former secretary Hammond to Charles Jenkinson, who in turn passed on the name to newly appointed Foreign Secretary William Grenville. Hammond was soon given the job, boarded a ship for Philadelphia in September 1791 along with Edward Thornton, secretary of legation, and arrived five weeks later on 20 October.

Hammond initially met with then Secretary of State Thomas Jefferson, but waited to formally present himself to President George Washington before an American minister to Great Britain was chosen; his reception on 11 November 1791 formally established relations between the two countries. Although Hammond described his situation as "new, critical and rather embarrassing", he also stated that "If I accepted a quarter of the invitations to dinner and tea parties which I receive I should have little time for business", and said of the leading families that "I have reason to think most of them are Tories at heart."

Hammond had four children, aged oldest to youngest: William Andrew, George, Margaret, Edmund. His son, Edmund Hammond, would also join the Foreign Office.

Hammond left his post on 14 August 1795, leaving the consul general at Philadelphia, Phineas Bond, in charge until Robert Liston arrived in America.

== Later career ==
Following his return from the United States, Hammond became an Undersecretary at the Foreign Office. In this position he advised and befriended Grenville and met George Canning; Canning founded the newspaper the Anti-Jacobin in 1797, and Hammond acted as joint-editor. Hammond would later be sent to one or two posts in continental Europe, and sometime in the 1810s he was appointed as a commissioner on the Arbitration of Revolutionary Indemnities, and as such spent many years living alternatively in London and Paris. Hammond died in 1853 at the age of eighty-nine or ninety.

== Timeline of career ==
- Secretary to Mr. Hartley's mission at Paris (1783 – 1784)
- Charge d'Affairs at Vienna (21 September 1788 – 10 October 1789)
- Secretary of legation at Copenhagen (20 February 1790 – 23 September 1790)
- Secretary of embassy at Madrid (24 September 1790 – 5 July 1791)
- Minister plenipotentiary to the United States (5 July 1791 – 30 October 1795)
- Under secretary of state for foreign affairs (10 October 1795 – 20 February 1806)
- Under secretary of state for foreign affairs (5 April 1807 – 11 November 1809)
- Commissioner for British claims on France (September 1814 – July 1828)

== See also ==
- List of Ambassadors from the United Kingdom to the United States

Diplomatic posts
| Preceded by New post | British Minister to the United States; 1791 – 1795 | Succeeded by Robert Liston |
