= Baron Inchyra =

Barony in the Peerage of the United Kingdom

Baron Inchyra, of St Madoes in the County of Perth, is a title in the Peerage of the United Kingdom. It was created on 2 February 1962 for the diplomat Sir Frederick Millar, who had previously served as British Ambassador to West Germany. As of 2021, the title is held by his grandson, the third Baron, who succeeded in 2011.

The family seat is Inchyra House, near Glencarse, Perth.

== Barons Inchyra (1962) ==
- Frederick Robert Hoyer Millar, 1st Baron Inchyra (1900–1989)
- Robert Charles Reneke Hoyer Millar, 2nd Baron Inchyra (1935–2011)
- (Christian) James Charles Hoyer Millar, 3rd Baron Inchyra (b. 1962)

The heir apparent is the present holder's only son, Hon. Jake Christian Robert Hoyer Millar (b. 1996).

=== Line of succession ===
- Frederick Hoyer Millar, 1st Baron Inchyra (1900–1989)
  - Robert Charles Reneke Hoyer Millar, 2nd Baron Inchyra (1935–2011)
    - (Christian) James Charles Hoyer Millar, 3rd Baron Inchyra (born 1962)
      - (1) Hon. Jake Christian Robert Hoyer Millar (b. 1996)
  - Hon. Alastair James Harold Hoyer Millar (1936–2023)
    - (2) Mark Cristian Frederick Hoyer Millar (b. 1975)

== Arms ==
Coat of arms of Baron Inchyra

Crest
A cubit arm the hand erect and in the act of blessing Proper.
Escutcheon
Quarterly 1st Or a cross moline Azure and base barry undy Gules and Vert on a chief of the third a lozenge of the first between two spur-revels also of the first (Millar) 2nd per bend Argent and Vert a lion passant Gules (Hoyer) 3rd Azure a chevron Argent between two spur-revels in chief and a demi-moon reversed Or (van Swinderden) 4th Azure a cross Argent cantoned between four roses Or (de Marees).
Supporters
Two blackcock Proper.
Motto
Manent Optima Corlo (The Best Awaits In Heaven)
