= Edmund Hammond, 1st Baron Hammond =

British diplomat

The Right Honourable The Lord Hammond PC
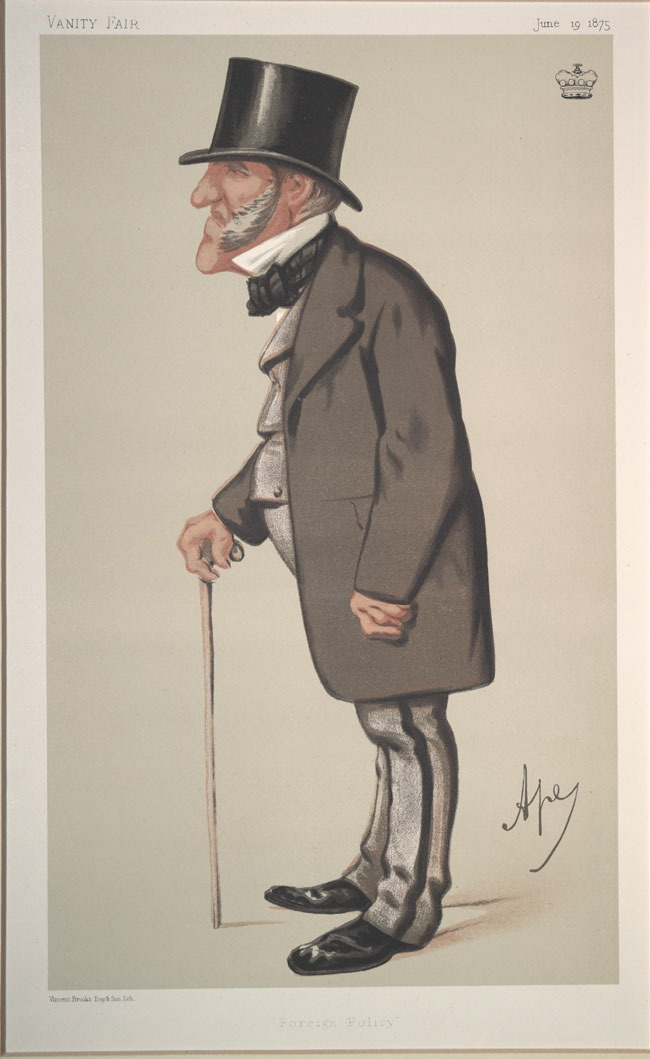
- Caricature by Ape published in Vanity Fair in 1875.

Permanent Under-Secretary of State for Foreign Affairs
- In office 1854-1873

Personal details
- Born: 25 June 1802
- Died: 29 April 1890 (aged 87)
- Spouse: Mary Frances Kerr (m. 1846; died 1888)
- Children: 2
- Parent: George Hammond (father)

Edmund Hammond, 1st Baron Hammond PC (25 June 1802 – 29 April 1890), was a British diplomat and civil servant. He was Permanent Under-Secretary of State for Foreign Affairs from 1854 to 1873.

== Background ==
Hammond was the third son and youngest child of George Hammond, a diplomat and civil servant, and Margaret, daughter of Andrew Allen.

== Political career ==
Hammond entered the Civil Service in 1823. He served as Permanent Under-Secretary of State for Foreign Affairs from 1854 to 1873, a post previously held by his father. He was sworn of the Privy Council in 1866 and elevated to the peerage as Baron Hammond, of Kirkella in the Town and County of the Town of Kingston-upon-Hull, in 1874. He was a regular contributor in the House of Lords between 1875 and 1880.

== Family ==
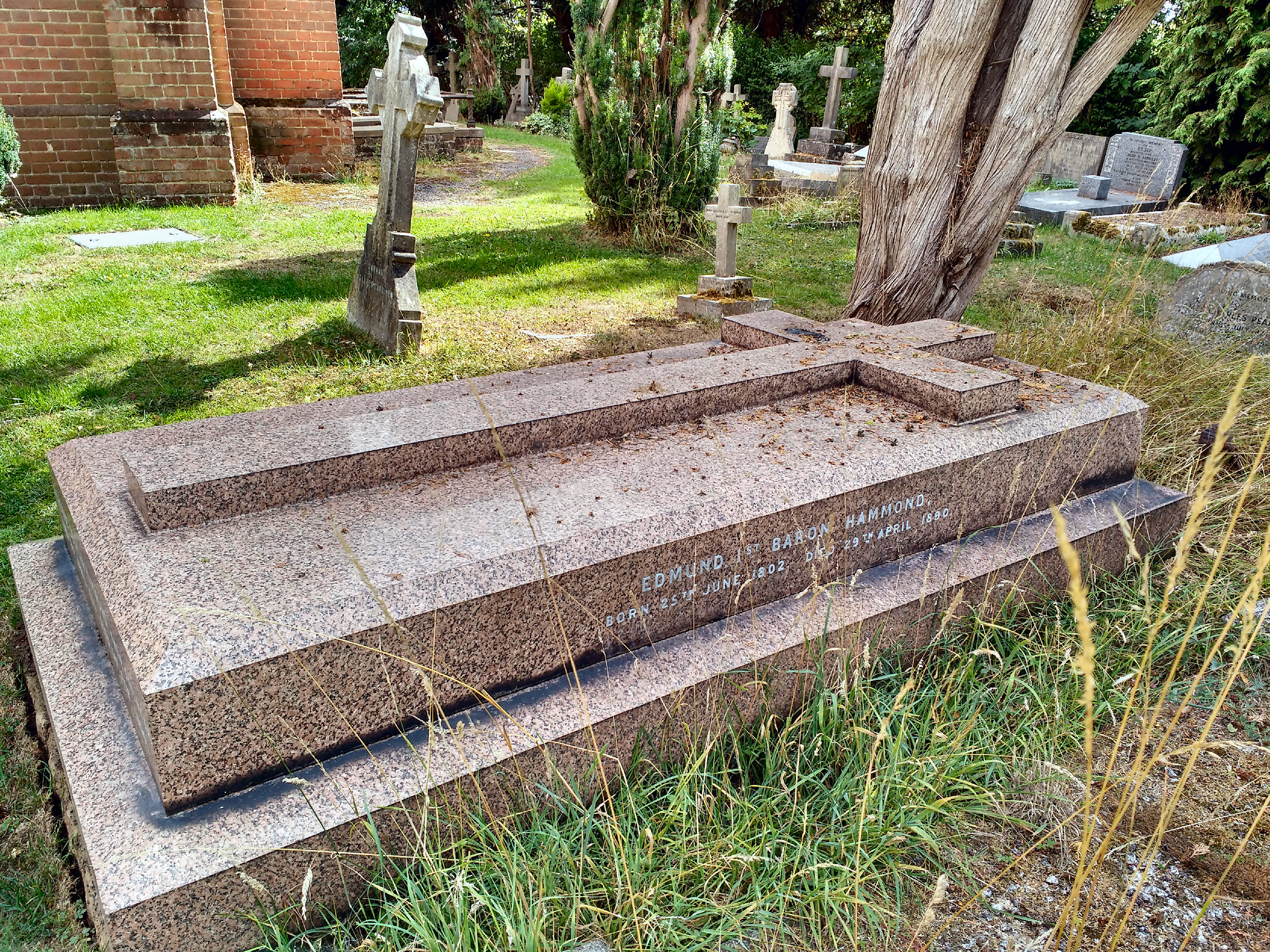
St John the Baptist's Church, Old Malden

Lord Hammond married Mary Frances, daughter of Major-General Lord Robert Kerr, in 1846. They had three daughters. Lady Hammond died in London on 14 June 1888, aged 72. Lord Hammond survived her by two years and died in April 1890, aged 87. The barony died with him as he had no sons. There is a marble bust of Lord Hammond by Henry Weekes at the Foreign Office, London.

Lord Hammond and his wife are buried at St John the Baptist's Church, Old Malden.

== Arms ==
Coat of arms of Edmund Hammond, 1st Baron Hammond
Crest Between a stag’s attires a falcon rising Proper each wing charged with a mullet Or. Escutcheon Argent on a chevron Pean between three mullets Sable a sun in splendour Or. Supporters On either side a falcon wings elevated Proper gorged with a chain Or pendent therefrom an escutcheon Argent charged with a mullet Sable. Motto Per Tot Discrimina Rerum

Government offices
Preceded by Henry Unwin Addington	Permanent Under-Secretary of State for Foreign Affairs; 1854–1873	Succeeded by The Lord Tenterden
Peerage of the United Kingdom
New creation	Baron Hammond; 1874–1890	Extinct
