= Harold Caccia =

British diplomat (1905–1990)

The Right Honourable The Lord Caccia GCMG GCVO GCStJ
- Caccia in 1962

Permanent Under-Secretary of State for Foreign Affairs
- In office 1962–1965
- Foreign Secretary: Home, Butler, Gordon Walker, Stewart
- Preceded by: Sir Frederick Millar
- Succeeded by: Sir Paul Gore-Booth

Personal details
- Born: 21 December 1905
- Died: 31 October 1990 (aged 84)

Harold Anthony Caccia, Baron Caccia, GCMG, GCVO, GCStJ (21 December 1905 – 31 October 1990) was a British diplomat who rose to become Permanent Under-Secretary of State for Foreign Affairs from 1962 to 1965.

== Biography ==
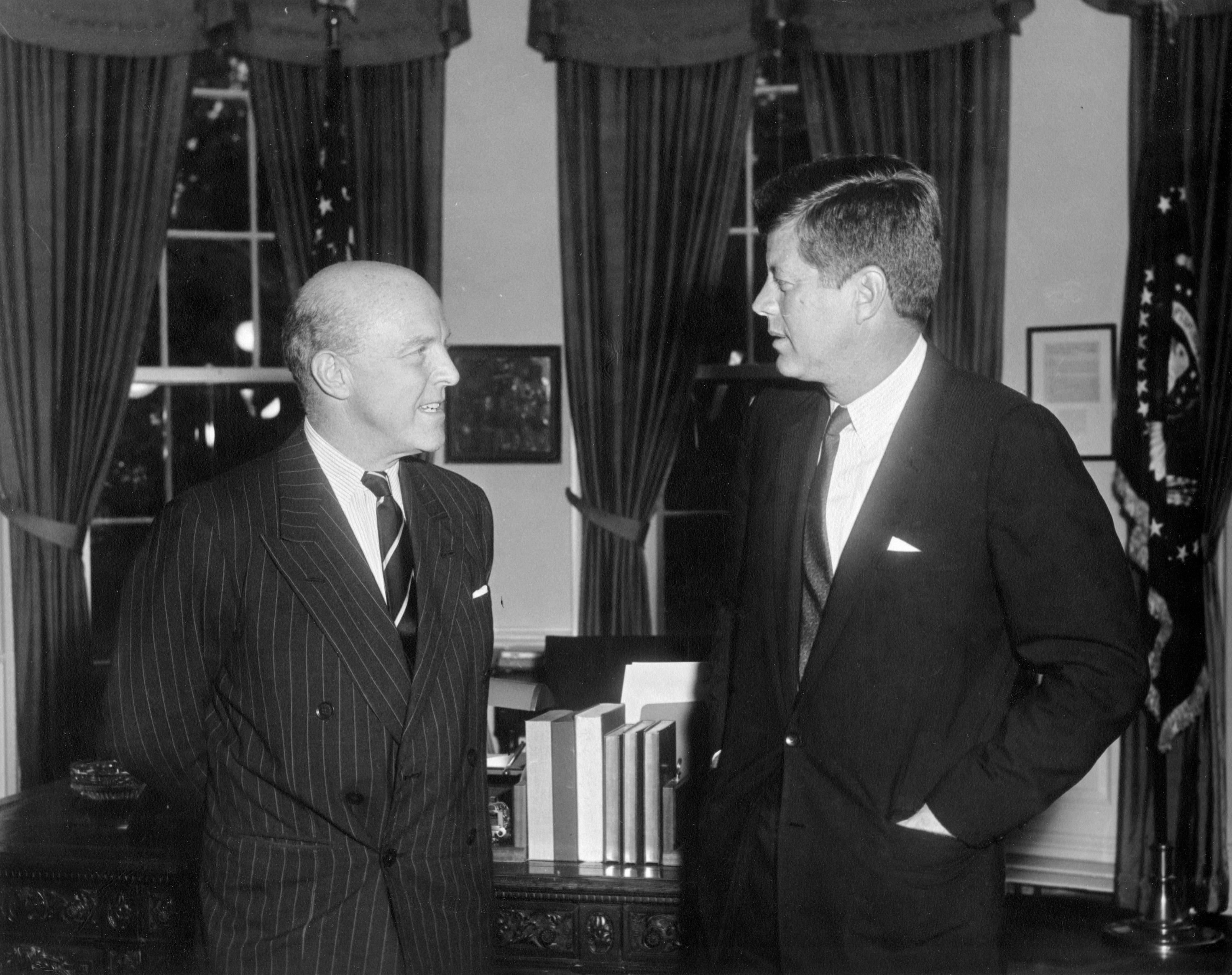
Caccia with President John F. Kennedy in 1961

Born in Pachmarhi, British India, Caccia was educated at Summer Fields School, Eton College and Trinity College, Oxford and won a Blue at rugby union, playing at centre for Oxford in the Varsity Match in 1926. He played cricket for Oxfordshire in the Minor Counties Championship between 1928 and 1938. In 1932 he married Anne Catherine Barstow, daughter of Sir George Barstow and Enid Lillian Lawrence.

Caccia entered the diplomatic service in 1929 and was posted to Peking and then to Athens and London where, in 1936, he became assistant private secretary to Anthony Eden. He was back in Athens early in World War II, but was then attached to the staff of Harold Macmillan, Britain's representative at Allied headquarters in North Africa. The Greek Civil War once again saw him in that country, and by 1945 his services earned him recognition as a Companion of the Order of St Michael and St George (CMG).

Caccia was Ambassador to Austria from 1951 to 1954, and from 1956 to 1961 Ambassador to the United States. He was sent to Washington to repair relations badly damaged by the Suez Crisis of 1956. The breakdown in mutual confidence arose when Britain and France joined an Israeli invasion of Egypt and sent military forces to capture the Suez Canal, which had been nationalised by President Gamal Abdel Nasser of Egypt. In the years that followed, he was instrumental in restoring and nurturing the "special relationship" between London and Washington.

His daughter Clarissa married David Pryce-Jones, son of Alan Pryce-Jones and Thérèse Fould-Springer ("Poppy").

In 1961, he became Permanent Under-Secretary of State, an office he held until 1965. He was Provost of Eton 1965-78 and President of the Marylebone Cricket Club (MCC) in 1973–74.

He was knighted in 1950, and was created a life peer with the title Baron Caccia, of Abernant in the County of Brecknock, on 11 May 1965. Caccia was appointed a Bailiff Grand Cross and Lord Prior of the Order of the Hospital of St John of Jerusalem, a Knight Grand Cross of the Royal Victorian Order and a Knight Grand Cross of the Order of St Michael and St George. Lord Caccia was a Knight of the International Order of St. Hubertus.

Caccia died in Builth Wells, Wales.

== Arms ==
Coat of arms of Harold Caccia
Crest An Eagle wings elevated Sable gorged with a Collar paly Argent and Gules resting the dexter claw on a Roundel Argent charged with a Fleur-de-lys Gules Escutcheon Per bend barry of six Gules and Argent and Or in base a Lion's Gamb erased of the first Supporters On either side a Lion Gules supporting between the fore paws a Staff at the head a Fleur-de-lys Or Motto Seguo ed inseguo

== Notes ==
Diplomatic posts
Preceded by Bertrand Jerram	British Ambassador to Austria; 1951–1954	Succeeded by Geoffrey Wallinger
Preceded by Roger Makins	British Ambassador to the United States; 1956–1961	Succeeded by David Ormsby-Gore
Government offices
Preceded by Sir Frederick Hoyer Millar	Permanent Under-Secretary of State for Foreign Affairs; 1962–1965	Succeeded by Sir Paul Gore-Booth
Academic offices
Preceded by Claude Aurelius Elliott	Provost of Eton; 1965–1978	Succeeded by Martin Charteris
