= Judy Montagu =

English socialite (1923–1972)

- Montagu in 1954
- Born: 6 February 1923; England
- Died: 1972 (aged 48–49)
- Spouse: Milton Gendel (m. 1962)
- Children: 1
- Parents: Edwin Montagu (father); Venetia Stanley (mother)

Judith Venetia "Judy" Montagu (6 February 1923 – 8 November 1972) was an English socialite who was a close friend of Princess Margaret, Countess of Snowdon.

== Biography ==
Montagu was born on 6 February 1923. Legally, she was the daughter of British politician and Secretary of State for India Edwin Montagu. However, she may also have been the result of an affair between her mother, socialite Venetia Stanley, and William Ward, 3rd Earl of Dudley.

On her father's side, she was the granddaughter of Britain's most prominent merchant banker, Samuel Montagu, 1st Baron Swaythling. On her maternal side, she was the granddaughter of Edward Stanley, 4th Baron Stanley of Alderley and Mary Katherine Bell.

In September 1941, during the Second World War, Montagu joined the Auxiliary Territorial Service (ATS) with her cousin Mary Churchill. She was commissioned as a second subaltern (equivalent in rank to a second lieutenant in the British Army) on 4 December 1942. She was posted to a gun-site near Enfield as part of the 132nd (Mixed) Heavy Anti-Aircraft Regiment, Royal Artillery, after specifically asking to go into mixed-sex batteries.

Montagu was a close friend of Princess Margaret, Countess of Snowdon and sister of Queen Elizabeth II. They holidayed together in Italy. Princess Margaret confided her early romantic interest in Anthony Armstrong-Jones in Montagu, who would have kept Margaret's confidences to herself and away from the press.

In the 1950s, Montagu moved to Rome and took up residence on the Isola Tiberina. She married Milton Gendel in 1962. They had a daughter, Anna, whose godmother was Princess Margaret, Countess of Snowdon. She died from a stroke or heart attack in 1972, at the age of 49. She was buried at Cornwell Manor in Oxfordshire.
