= René de Marees van Swinderen =

Dutch diplomat and politician

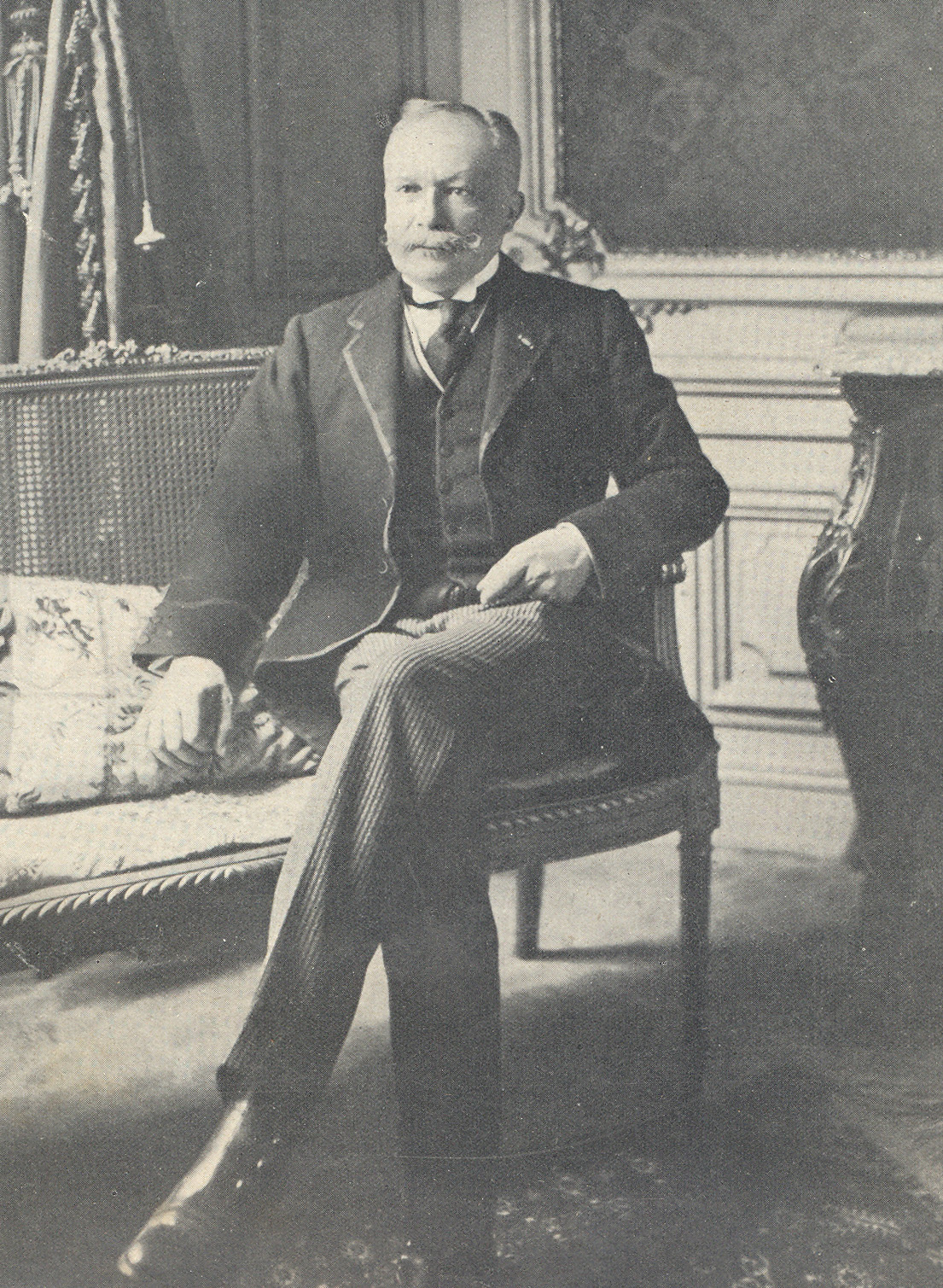
- Born: 6 October 1860; Groningen
- Died: 17 January 1955 (aged 94); London
- Occupations: Dutch diplomat, politician
- Spouse: Elizabeth Lindsay Glover
- Honours: Grand Cordon of the Order of Leopold

Jhr. Reneke (René) de Marees van Swinderen (6 October 1860, in Groningen – 17 January 1955, in London) was a Dutch diplomat and politician. He married Elizabeth Lindsay Glover on 21 December 1904 in Washington, D.C.

== Career ==
- From September 9, 1887 to 1888 he was Attaché in the Cabinet of the Minister, Ministry of Foreign Affairs.
- Until October 1889 he was Attaché in Berlin.
- From October 1889 to 1890 he was Attaché to Washington, D.C.
- From 1890 to April 1894 he was second class secretary of legation in Vienna.
- From April 9, 1894 to December 1899 he was first class secretary of legation to Saint Petersburg.
- From January 1900 to 1901 he was first class secretary of legation in Paris.
- From 1901 to 1903 he was minister at Bucharest.
- In 1904 he was minister at Belgrade.
- From February 18, 1904 to February 12, 1908 he was envoy extraordinary and minister plenipotentiary in Washington, D.C., also accredited in Mexico City.
- In December 1907 he left for the Netherlands.
- From February 12, 1908 to August 29, 1913 he was Minister for Foreign Affairs.

== Honours ==
- 1910: Grand Cordon of the Order of Leopold.
