= Baron Tennyson =

Title in the Peerage of the United Kingdom created in 1884

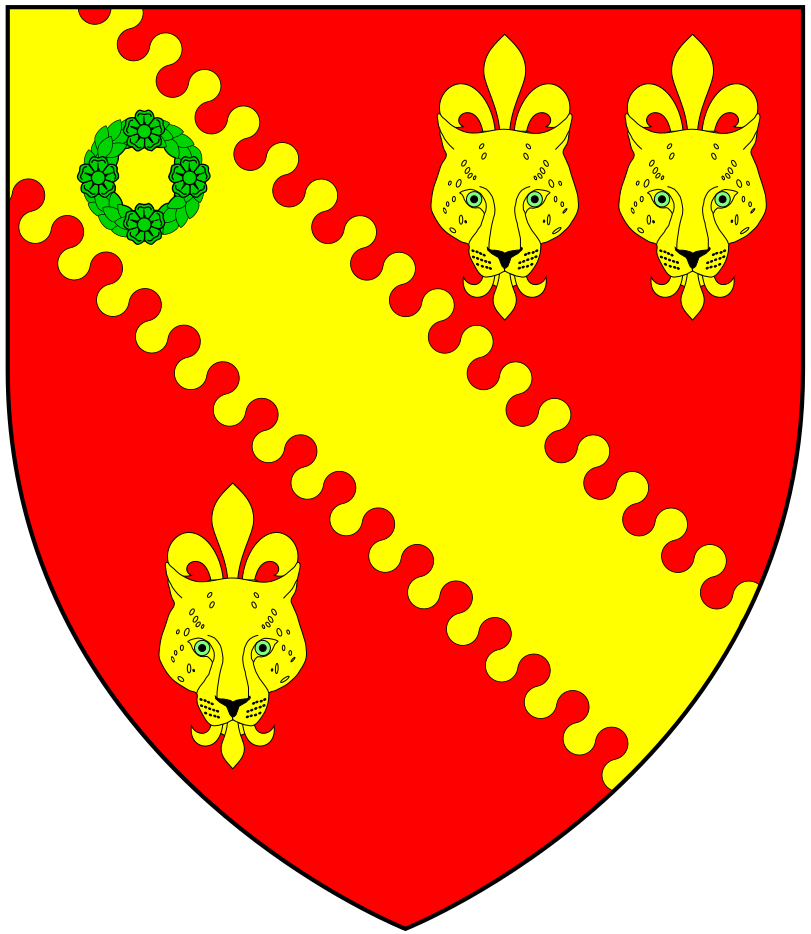
- Arms of Tennyson
- Creation date: 11 March 1884
- Created by: Victoria
- Peerage: United Kingdom
- First holder: Alfred, Lord Tennyson
- Present holder: David Tennyson, 6th Baron Tennyson
- Heir presumptive: Hon. Alan Tennyson
- Status: Extant
- Motto: Respiciens Prospiciens (Latin: "Looking backwards (is) (Note: Verbs (here est) are frequently omitted in Latin mottos for stylistic purposes) looking forwards" (i.e. "History repeats itself"; "If you want to see into the future study the past")
- Arms: Gules, a bend nebuly or thereon a chaplet vert between three leopard's faces jessant-de-lys of the second.

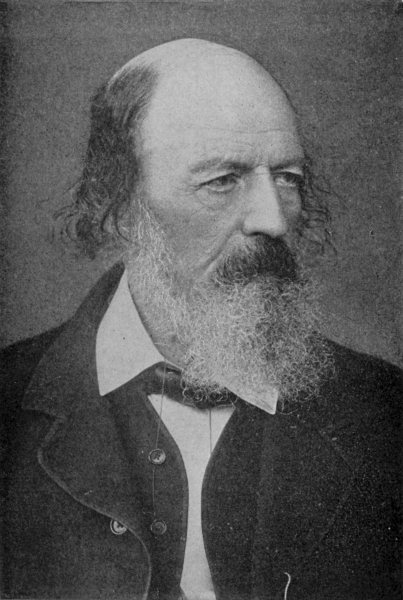
Alfred Tennyson, 1st Baron Tennyson, the poet, usually (though, strictly, incorrectly) referred to as "Alfred, Lord Tennyson". (Note: Such a style is properly used for the courtesy title of the eldest son and heir apparent of certain peers.)

Baron Tennyson, of Aldworth in the County of Sussex and of Freshwater in the Isle of Wight, is a title in the Peerage of the United Kingdom. It was created in 1884 for the poet Alfred Tennyson. His son, the second Baron, served as Governor-General of Australia, and his grandson, the third Baron, as a captain for the English cricket team.

On the death in 2006 of the latter's younger son, the fifth Baron, the line of the eldest son of the first Baron failed. The title was inherited by the late Baron's second cousin once removed, the sixth and present holder of the peerage. He is the great-grandson of the Hon. Lionel Tennyson, second son of the first Baron.

Another member of the Tennyson family was the naval architect Sir Eustace Tennyson-d'Eyncourt, 1st Baronet. He was the grandson of Charles Tennyson-d'Eyncourt, uncle of the first Baron Tennyson.

== Barons Tennyson (1884) ==
- Alfred Tennyson, 1st Baron Tennyson (1809–1892)
- Hallam Tennyson, 2nd Baron Tennyson (1852–1928), elder son of the 1st Baron
- Lionel Hallam Tennyson, 3rd Baron Tennyson (1889–1951), son of the 2nd Baron
- Harold Christopher Tennyson, 4th Baron Tennyson (1919–1991), elder son of the 3rd Baron
- Mark Aubrey Tennyson, 5th Baron Tennyson (1920–2006), younger son of the 3rd Baron
- David Harold Alexander Tennyson, 6th Baron Tennyson (b. 1960), great-great-grandson of the 1st baron

The heir presumptive is the present holder's brother, the Hon. Alan James Drummond Tennyson (b. 1965).

=== Title succession chart ===
Tennyson family tree including Barons Tennyson and Tennyson-d'Eyncourt baronets.

George Tennyson c. 1750–1835
Rev. George Tennyson c. 1780–1831	Charles Tennyson-d'Eyncourt; 1784–1861
Baron Tennyson, 1884
Alfred Tennyson; 1809–1892; 1st Baron Tennyson	Adm. Edwin Tennyson-d'Eyncourt; 1813–1903	Louis Tennyson-d'Eyncourt; 1814–1896
Tennyson-d'Eyncourt baronets, 1930
Hallam Tennyson; 1852–1928; 2nd Baron Tennyson	Lionel Tennyson; 1854–1886	Eustace Henry William Tennyson-d'Eyncourt; 1868–1951; 1st Baronet
Lionel Hallam Tennyson; 1889–1951; 3rd Baron Tennyson	Capt. Alfred Aubrey Tennyson; 1891–1918	Sub-Lt. Harold Courtenay Tennyson; 1896–1916	Alfred Tennyson; 1878–1952	(Eustace) Gervais Tennyson-d'Eyncourt; 1902–1971; 2nd Baronet
Harold Christopher Tennyson; 1919–1991; 4th Baron Tennyson	Mark Aubrey Tennyson; 1920–2006; 5th Baron Tennyson	Lionel Tennyson; 1925–1925	James Tennyson; 1913–2001	John Jeremy Eustace Tennyson-d'Eyncourt; 1927–1988; 3rd Baronet	Giles Gervais Tennyson-d'Eyncourt; 1935–1989; 4th Baronet
David Harold Alexander Tennyson b. 1960; 6th Baron Tennyson	Alan Tennyson b. 1965	Mark Gervais Tennyson-d'Eyncourt b. 1967; 5th Baronet
Heir presumtive to the Tennyson barony	There is no heir to the Tennyson-d'Eyncourt baronetcy.
Andrew James Drummond Tennyson b. 1992

=== Line of succession ===
- Alfred Tennyson, 1st Baron Tennyson (1809–1892)
  - Hon. Lionel Tennyson (1854–1886)
    - Alfred Browning Stanley Tennyson (1878–1952)
      - James Alfred Tennyson (1913–2001)
        - David Harold Alexander Tennyson, 6th Baron Tennyson (b. 1960)
        - (1) Hon. Alan James Drummond Tennyson (b. 1965)
          - (2) Andrew James Drummond Tennyson (b. 1992)
    - Sir Charles Bruce Locker Tennyson (1879–1977)
      - (Beryl) Hallam Augustine Tennyson (1920–2005)
        - (3) (Charles) Jonathan Penrose Tennyson (b. 1955)
          - (4) Alexander Hallam Hopson Tennyson (b. 1986)
          - (5) Matthew James Tennyson (b. 1988)
          - (6) Frederick Penrose Tennyson (b. 1991)

== See also ==
- Emily, Lady Tennyson, wife of the 1st Baron
- Tennyson-d'Eyncourt baronets, of Carter's Corner Farm

== Arms ==
Coat of arms of Baron Tennyson
Coronet A Coronet of a baron Crest A dexter arm in armour the hand in a gauntlet Or grasping a broken tilting spear enfiled with a garland of laurel Escutcheon Gules, a bend nebuly or thereon a chaplet in the chief point Vert between three leopard's faces jessant-de-lys of the second Supporters On either side a leopard rampant guardant Gules semy-de-lys and ducally crowned Or Motto Respiciens Prospiciens (Latin: "Looking backwards (is) looking forwards" (i.e. "History repeats itself"; "If you want to see into the future study the past")

== Sources ==
- Kidd, Charles, ed. (1903). Debrett's peerage, baronetage, knightage, and companionage. London: Dean & Son. p. 844.
- Leigh Rayment's Peerage Pages
