= Tennyson-d'Eyncourt baronets =

Baronetcy in the Baronetage of the United Kingdom

The Tennyson-d'Eyncourt baronetcy, of Carter's Corner Farm in the Parish of Herstmonceux in the County of Sussex, is a title in the Baronetage of the United Kingdom. It was created on 3 February 1930 for the naval architect Eustace Tennyson-d'Eyncourt, a grandson of Charles Tennyson-d'Eyncourt.

Another member of the Tennyson family was poet Alfred, Lord Tennyson, who was created Baron Tennyson in 1884. He was a nephew of Charles Tennyson-d'Eyncourt.

== Tennyson-d'Eyncourt baronets, of Carter's Corner Farm (1930) ==
- Sir Eustace Henry William Tennyson-d'Eyncourt, 1st Baronet (1868–1951)
- Sir (Eustace) Gervais Tennyson-d'Eyncourt, 2nd Baronet (1902–1971)
- Sir John Jeremy Eustace Tennyson-d'Eyncourt, 3rd Baronet (1927–1988)
- Sir Giles Gervais Tennyson-d'Eyncourt, 4th Baronet (1935–1989)
- Sir Mark Gervais Tennyson-d'Eyncourt, 5th Baronet (born 1967)

There is no heir to the baronetcy.

=== Title succession chart ===
Title succession chart, Barons Tennyson and Tennyson-d'Eyncourt baronets.

George Tennyson c. 1750 – 1835
Rev. George Tennyson c. 1780 – 1831	Rt Hon. Charles Tennyson- d'Eyncourt; 1784–1861
Baron Tennyson
Alfred Tennyson; 1st Baron Tennyson; 1809–1892	Adm. Edwin Tennyson- d'Eyncourt; 1813–1903	Louis Tennyson- d'Eyncourt; 1814–1896
Tennyson-d'Eyncourt baronets
Hallam Tennyson; 2nd Baron Tennyson; 1852–1928	Hon. Lionel Tennyson; 1854–1886	Sir Eustace Tennyson- d'Eyncourt; 1st Baronet; 1868–1951
Lionel Tennyson; 3rd Baron Tennyson; 1889–1951	Capt. Hon. Alfred Tennyson; 1891–1918	Sub-Lt. Hon. Harold Tennyson; 1896–1916	Alfred Tennyson; 1878–1952	Sir Gervais Tennyson- d'Eyncourt; 2nd Baronet; 1902–1971
Harold Tennyson; 4th Baron Tennyson; 1919–1991	Mark Tennyson; 5th Baron Tennyson; 1920–2006	Lionel Tennyson; 1925–1925	James Tennyson; 1913–2001	Sir John Tennyson- d'Eyncourt; 3rd Baronet; 1927–1988	Sir Giles Tennyson- d'Eyncourt; 4th Baronet; 1935–1989
David Tennyson; 6th Baron Tennyson born 1960	Alan Tennyson born 1965	Sir Mark Tennyson- d'Eyncourt; 5th Baronet born 1967
Andrew Tennyson born 1992

== See also ==
- Baron Tennyson
