= Charles Tennyson =

Charles Tennyson may refer to:

- Charles Tennyson-d'Eyncourt (1784–1861), British politician, uncle of the poet Lord Tennyson
- Charles Tennyson Turner (1808–1879), his nephew and brother of the poet Lord Tennyson
- Charles Tennyson (civil servant) (1879–1977), grandson of the poet Lord Tennyson, British civil servant and industrialist
- (Charles) Julian Tennyson (1915–1945), his son and great-grandson of the poet Lord Tennyson, English writer and historian
- (Charles) Jonathan Tennyson (physicist) (born 1955), his nephew and great-great-grandson of the poet Lord Tennyson, British physicist
