= James Beck (disambiguation) =

James Beck (1929–1973) was an English actor.

James or Jim Beck may also refer to:

- James Beck (art historian) (1930–2007), American art historian specializing in the Italian Renaissance
- James B. Beck (1822–1890), American congressman from Kentucky
- James M. Beck (1861–1936), American politician and author from Pennsylvania
- James M. Beck Jr. (1892–1972) American soldier, businessman and society figure
- James N. Beck (1923– 1973), member of the Florida House of Representatives
- James Garfield Beck (1881–1969), American educator, coach, postal clerk, socialite, and community leader
- James Murray Beck (1914–2011), Canadian historian
- Jim Beck (music producer) (1916–1956), American country music talent agent and record producer
- Jim Beck (politician) (born 1961), American politician
