= Audrey Tennyson =

Letter-writer, hospital founder and vice-regal wife (1854–1916)

The Right Honourable The Baroness Tennyson
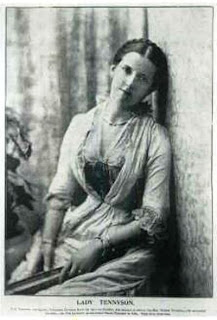

Spouse of the governor-general of Australia
- In office 9 January 1903 – 21 January 1904
- Monarch: Edward VII
- Governor General: Lord Tennyson
- Preceded by: Countess Hopetoun
- Succeeded by: Alice, Lady Northcote

Personal details
- Born: Audrey Georgiana Florence Boyle; 19 August 1854 Tillington
- Died: 7 December 1916 (aged 62) Freshwater
- Spouse: Hallam Tennyson, 2nd Baron Tennyson
- Children: Lionel Tennyson, 3rd Baron Tennyson; Hon. Alfred Aubrey Tennyson; Hon. Harold Courtenay Tennyson
- Known for: Vice-regal wife

Audrey Georgiana Florence Tennyson, Baroness Tennyson (née Boyle; 15 August 1854 – 7 December 1916) was a British letter-writer, hospital founder and wife of Hallam Tennyson, 2nd Baron Tennyson, the second governor-general of Australia.

== Life ==
She was born in Sussex in 1854. Her parents were Zacyntha Antonia Lorenzina (born Moore) and Charles John Boyle. She was brought up within the British Empire at first in South Africa and from 1856 in Mauritius. From 1868 she became her father's carer until he died in 1882. She had met the poet Alfred, Lord Tennyson at his home Farringford House on the Isle of Wight. In 1884 she married his son and heir Hallam Tennyson.

She had enjoyed her time in the British colonies so she supported her husband when he was offered the position of Governor of South Australia. She and Hallam and their three sons arrived in Australia in 1899.

She and Hallam enjoyed their time at the summer residence of Marble Hill, despite having to contend with heat, drought and bushfires during their stays.

The intense heat and drought of the summer of 1901 resulted in a number of bushfires while Lord and Lady Tennyson were in residence. Lady Tennyson wrote that the bushfires, with their billowing smoke and glowing hilltops by night, were a remarkable sight. The gardens and part of the orchard were damaged in the fire.

By 1902 her husband was Governor-General and they returned to Marble Hill and they discussed buying the house if it became available. They left Australia after a year of Hallam being the Governor-General.

262 letters survive from Tennyson to her mother during her time in Australia. The letters were rediscovered and are now in Canberra. They have been the basis of a book edited by Alexandra Hasluck.

Tennyson supported Agnes Milne, who was a trade unionist, activist and factory inspector, in her oak to end sweated labour. Tennyson said that Milne was "a very interesting, sensible woman".

Her husband donated land for a new church in Freshwater Bay. Audrey suggested that the church be named for St Agnes. St Agnes Church was consecrated on 12 August 1908.

== Death and family ==
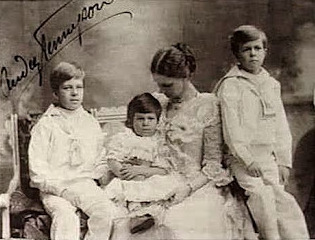
Audrey Tennyson and her sons

Tennyson died in Freshwater in 1916.

She had three sons:

- Lionel Hallam Tennyson, 3rd Baron Tennyson (7 November 1889 – 6 June 1951), married Hon. Clare Tennant, daughter of Edward Tennant, 1st Baron Glenconner; remarried to Carroll Donner (née Elting)
- Captain Hon. Alfred Aubrey Tennyson (1891–1918), killed in action during World War I
- Sub-Lieutenant Hon. Harold Courtenay Tennyson (1896–1916), killed in action during World War I

== See also ==
- Spouse of the Governor-General of Australia
