= Clare Tennant =

British socialite

The Honourable Clare Tennant
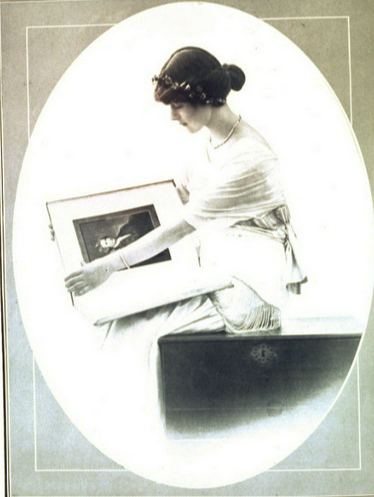
- Portrait photo in The Tatler, 1916
- Born: Clarissa Madeline Georgiana Felicite Tennant; 13 July 1896
- Died: 3 September 1960 (aged 64)
- Burial place: Traquair Kirkyard, Traquair, Scotland
- Spouses: Adrian Bethell (m. 1915; div. 1918) Hon. Lionel Tennyson (m. 1918; div. 1928) James M. Beck Jr. (m. 1928; div. 1939)
- Children: 6
- Parents: Edward Tennant, 1st Baron Glenconner (father); Pamela Wyndham (mother)
- Relatives: Margot Asquith, Countess of Oxford and Asquith (paternal aunt); Edward Grey, 1st Viscount Grey of Fallodon (stepfather); Edward Tennant (brother); David Tennant (brother); Stephen Tennant (brother); Emma Tennant (niece); Stella Tennant (great-niece)

Clarissa Madeline Georgiana Felicite Tennant (later Bethell, Tennyson and Beck; 13 July 1896 – 3 September 1960), known as Clare Tennant, was a British socialite, prominent in early 20th century high society in London.

== Early life ==
Clare was born on 13 July 1896. She was the only daughter of Edward Tennant, 1st Baron Glenconner, and Pamela Wyndham. Among her brothers was poet Edward, Stephen and David Tennant.

Her paternal grandparents were Emma Winsloe and Sir Charles Tennant, 1st Baronet. Her uncle was Harold Tennant, and her aunt, Margot Tennant was the wife of Prime Minister H. H. Asquith.

In her younger years she was often seen at the Ritz Hotel in London, dining with the likes of Lady Cynthia Asquith, Osbert Sitwell, Gilbert Russell and Maud Julia Augusta Russell. Mary Abbott describes her as a "notorious 'bolter'", while Barbara Cartland in her 1970 autobiography "We Danced All Night" called her "one of the most beautiful women I have ever seen".

== Personal life ==
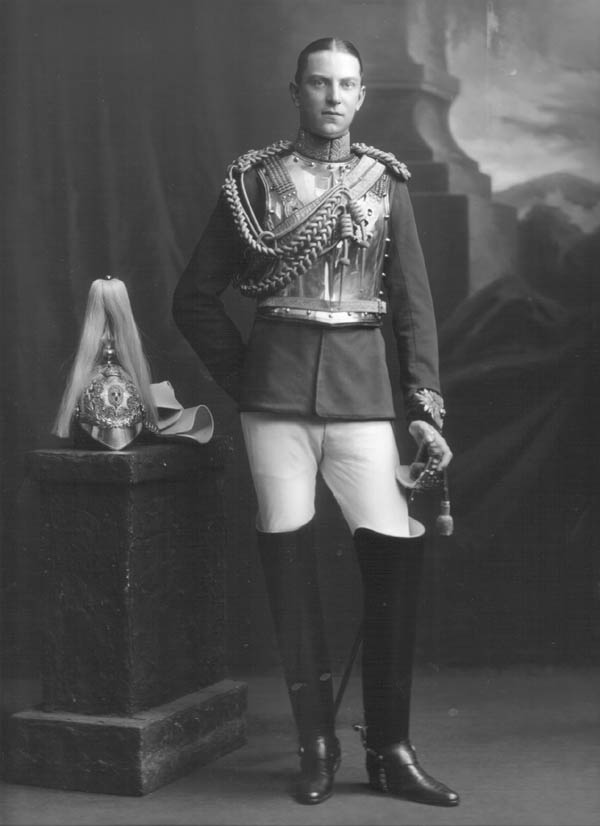
Her first husband, Capt. Adrian Vincent Bethell, 24 July 1912

She married three times. Her first marriage was to William Adrian Vincent Bethell, whom she married on 18 August 1915. Before they divorced in 1918, they were the parents of one daughter:

- Diana Hermione Bethell (1916–1967), who married Richard Purcell Blow, and had issue, the author Simon Blow

On 27 March 1918, she remarried to Major Hon. Lionel Tennyson (later the 3rd Baron Tennyson), grandson of poet Alfred, Lord Tennyson and the son of Audrey and Hallam Tennyson, 2nd Baron Tennyson, Governor-General of Australia. Before their divorce in 1928, they were the parents of three sons, including the 4th and 5th Baron Tennyson:

- Harold Christopher Tennyson (1919–1991), the 4th Baron Tennyson who died unmarried
- Mark Aubrey Tennyson (1920–2006), the 5th Baron Tennyson who married Deline Celeste Budler but died without issue
- Lionel Tennyson (1925–1925), who died in infancy

In 1928, she married James Montgomery Beck Jr., son of James M. Beck, a Republican U.S. Representative from Pennsylvania who served as U.S. Solicitor General under Presidents Warren G. Harding and Calvin Coolidge. Before their separation in 1936 and divorce in 1939, they became the parents of twins:

- James Montgomery Beck III (1929–2006), who adopted Rev. David Lawson-Beck
- Virginia Clare Beck (1929–2008)

She died on 3 September 1960 aged 64 and is buried at the Traquair Kirkyard in Traquair, Scotland.
