= Mary Brotherton =

English writer (1820–1910)

Mary Isabella Irwin Brotherton (1820–1910) was an English novelist, poet and critic.

== Biography ==
She was the daughter of judge John Melford Rees. In August 1851, she married a landscape painter, Augustus Henry Brotherton, and they lived in Rome, where Brotherton made most of her publications.

Brotherton was interested in mediumship through automatic writing, and gained some attention when she reportedly produced Greek writing without any knowledge of the language.

From 1887, Brotherton was a friend and neighbour of Alfred, Lord Tennyson and his brother Frederick. She helped get Frederick's poetry collection Days and Hours published.

== Works ==
- Poems (1855)
- Arthur Brandon (1856)
- Respectable Sinners (1863)
- Old Acquaintance (1874)
- Rosemary for Remembrance (poetry collection, 1895)
