= Hallam Tennyson (radio producer) =

British radio producer (1920–2005)

- Born: Beryl Hallam Augustine Tennyson; 10 December 1920; Chelsea, London, England
- Died: 21 December 2005 (aged 85); Highgate, London, England
- Cause of death: Murder
- Education: Eton College; Balliol College, Oxford
- Employer: BBC Radio (1956–1974)
- Spouse: Margot Wallach (m. 1945; dissolved 1971)
- Children: 2, incl. Jonathan
- Father: Sir Charles Tennyson
- Family: Tennyson
- Writing career
- Genres: Radio play; biography; memoir
- Notable works: Contemporary One-Act Plays (1976, co-editor); Studies in Tennyson (1981, editor); The Haunted Mind (1984)

Beryl Hallam Augustine Tennyson (10 December 1920 – 21 December 2005) was an English radio producer and writer, best known for his tenure as Assistant Head of Radio Drama at the BBC between 1964 and 1974.

== Early life and education ==
Hallam Tennyson was born in Chelsea, the third son of Sir Charles Tennyson and his wife Ivy (née Pretious). He was a great-grandson of the Poet Laureate Alfred, Lord Tennyson.

Tennyson was educated at Eton College before attending Balliol College, Oxford between 1938 and 1940. He left university before earning a degree.

== Career ==
During the Second World War, Tennyson was a conscientious objector and served in the Friends' Ambulance Unit between 1940 and 1945, working in Egypt and Italy. Both of his elder brothers died during the war, Penrose in 1941 and Julian in 1945.

Tennyson joined the BBC World Service in 1956, working as a radio producer and becoming an assistant head of drama in 1964, holding this position for a decade. His own radio play The Spring of the Beast, an account of the friendship between Henry James and author Constance Fenimore Woolson, was broadcast on BBC Radio 4 as The Monday Play on 26 May and repeated as Afternoon Theatre on 31 May 1986.

== Personal life ==
He married Margot Wallach in Kensington, London, in 1945. She was born on 30 March 1921 in Mönchengladbach, Germany, and died on 19 April 1999 in Highgate, London. Wallach was a Jewish refugee who had arrived in Britain after fleeing Nazi Germany. The couple had a daughter, Rosalind (born in 1950) and a son, the physicist Jonathan Tennyson (born in 1955). One of his grandchildren is the stage and screen actor Matthew Tennyson.

Tennyson nursed his wife through her regular spells of mental illness. During the 1970s he began to campaign for gay rights, and around that time revealed his homosexuality, writing in 1984 an autobiography, The Haunted Mind, which was serialised in a newspaper.

== Death ==
Tennyson was stabbed to death in his bed, at home in Highgate, in December 2005. His murder remains unsolved.

== Works ==
=== Selected radio plays ===
Year	Title	Note
1965	Gwendolen Harleth	Based on George Elliot's Daniel Deronda; also broadcast in 1976
1966	Harold	Adaptation of the original stage play by Alfred, Lord Tennyson
1973	The Last Temptation	Adapted from Nikos Kazantzakis's novel with Andreas Stavrou
1981	On Balance	
1982	No Ordinary Light	
1986	The Spring of the Beast	Based on the life of Henry James; also published in Volume 50 of The Visva-Bharati Quarterly

=== Publications ===
- Tennyson, Hallam (1948). The Wall of Dust, and Other Stories. New York: Viking Press.
- ———————— (1955). Tito Lifts the Curtain the story of Yugoslavia today. London: Rider and Company.
- ———————— (1955). Saint on the March: The Story of Vinoba. London: Victor Gollancz.
- ———————— (1955). India's Walking Saint: The Story of Vinoba Bhave. New York: Doubleday.
- Redmond, James; Tennyson, Hallam, eds. (1976). Contemporary One-Act Plays. Heinemann Educational Books. ISBN 0 435 23723 3.
- Tennyson, Hallam, ed. (1981). Studies in Tennyson. London: The Macmillan Press. doi:10.1007/978-1-349-05134-2. ISBN 978-1-349-05134-2. Full access available to users of The Wikipedia Library.
- Tennyson, Hallam (1984). The Haunted Mind: An autobiography. London: André Deutsch. ISBN 0-233-97618-3.
