= Hallam Tennyson, 2nd Baron Tennyson =

British aristocrat (1852–1928)

The Right Honourable The Lord Tennyson GCMG, PC
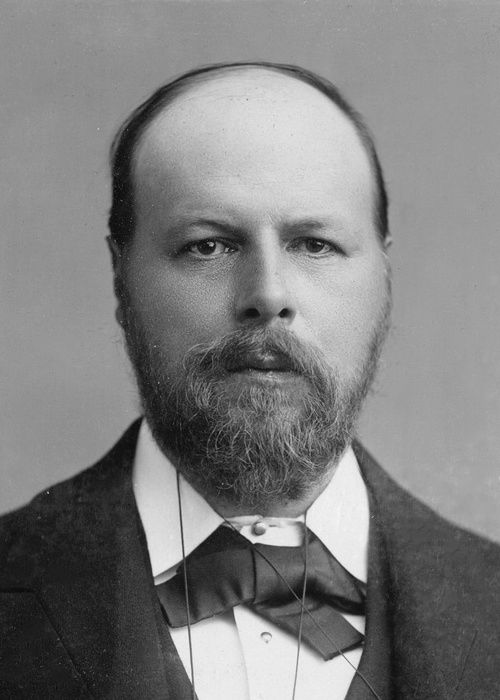
- Tennyson c. 1899–1902

2nd Governor-General of Australia
- In office 9 January 1903 – 21 January 1904; Acting: 17 July 1902 – 9 January 1903
- Monarch: Edward VII
- Prime Minister: Sir Edmund Barton; Alfred Deakin
- Preceded by: Lord Hopetoun
- Succeeded by: Lord Northcote

14th Governor of South Australia
- In office 10 April 1899 – 17 July 1902
- Monarchs: Victoria; Edward VII
- Premier: Charles Kingston; Vaiben Solomon; Frederick Holder; John Jenkins
- Preceded by: Sir Thomas Buxton
- Succeeded by: Sir George Le Hunte

Member of the House of Lords Lord Temporal
- In office 6 October 1892 – 2 December 1928; Hereditary Peerage
- Preceded by: Alfred Tennyson, 1st Baron Tennyson
- Succeeded by: Lionel Tennyson, 3rd Baron Tennyson

Personal details
- Born: 11 August 1852 Twickenham, Middlesex, England
- Died: 2 December 1928 (aged 76) Freshwater, Isle of Wight, England
- Spouses: Audrey Boyle (m. 1884; died 1916) May Prinsep (m. 1918)
- Children: Lionel Tennyson, 3rd Baron Tennyson; Hon. Alfred Aubrey Tennyson; Hon. Harold Courtenay Tennyson
- Parent(s): Alfred, Lord Tennyson; Emily Sellwood
- Education: Marlborough College; Trinity College, Cambridge

Hallam Tennyson, 2nd Baron Tennyson (11 August 1852 – 2 December 1928) was a British aristocrat who served as the second governor-general of Australia, in office from 1903 to 1904. He was previously Governor of South Australia from 1899 to 1902.

Tennyson was born in Twickenham, Middlesex, and educated at Marlborough College and Trinity College, Cambridge. He was the eldest son of the poet Alfred, Lord Tennyson, and served as his personal secretary and biographer; he succeeded to his father's title in 1892. Tennyson was made Governor of South Australia in 1899. When Lord Hopetoun resigned the governor-generalship in mid-1902, Tennyson was the longest-serving state governor and thus became Administrator of the Government. Tennyson was eventually chosen to be Hopetoun's permanent replacement, but accepted only a one-year term. He was more popular than his predecessor among the general public, but had a tense relationship with Prime Minister Alfred Deakin and was not offered an extension to his term. Tennyson retired to the Isle of Wight, and spent the rest of his life upholding his father's legacy.

== Early life ==
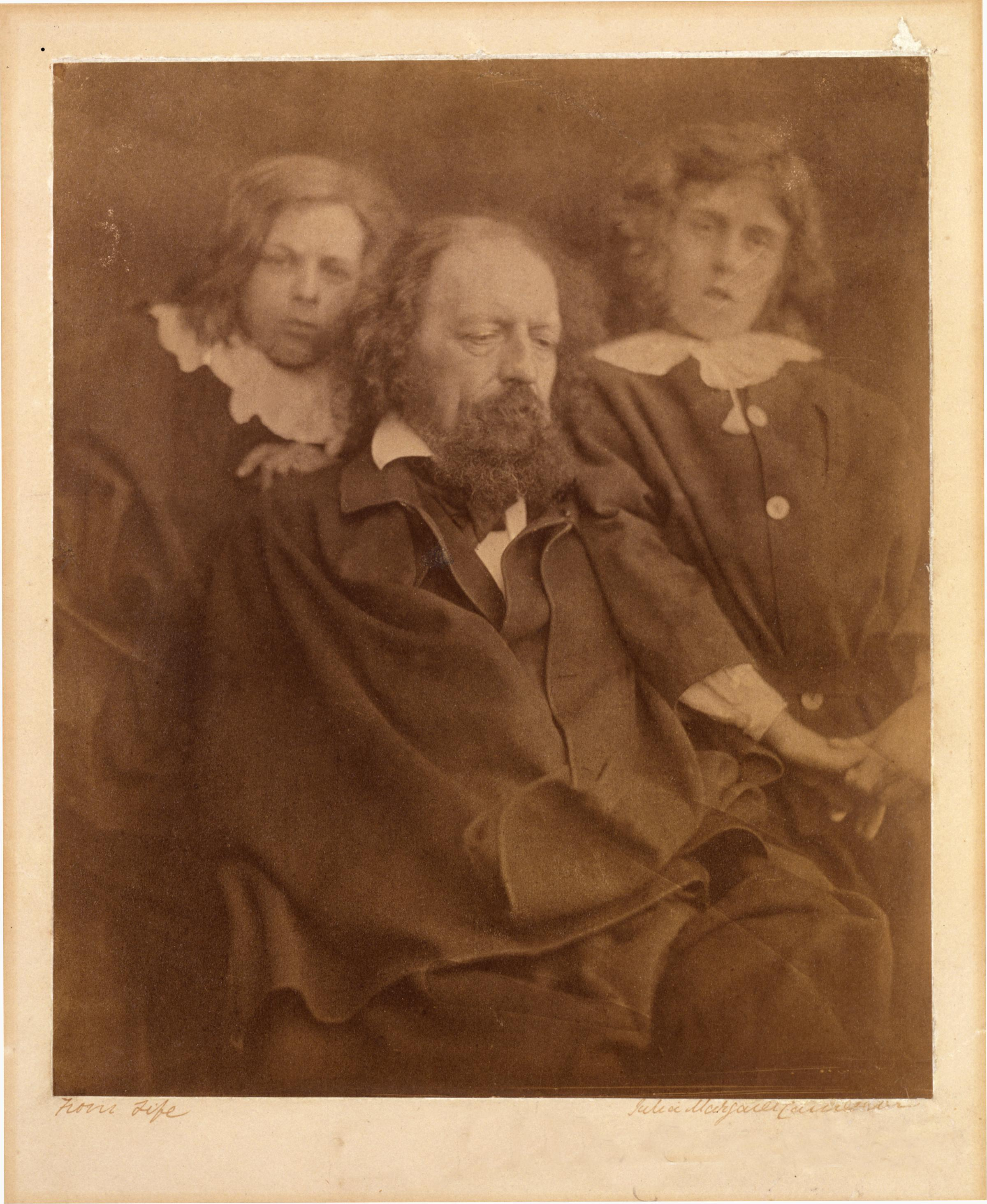
Alfred, Lord Tennyson, and his sons Hallam (left) and Lionel.

Hallam Tennyson was born in Chapel House, a house his father was renting in Twickenham, Middlesex. His parents were Emily (née Sellwood) and Alfred Tennyson. He was named after his father's deceased friend Arthur Hallam. Tennyson's early childhood was spent at Farringford House on the Isle of Wight, which his father began renting in 1853 and bought in 1856. He was educated at Marlborough College and Trinity College, Cambridge. Tennyson's career aspirations ended when his parents' age and ill-health obliged him to leave Cambridge to become their personal secretary. The idea of going into politics was also abandoned.

It was partly for Hallam's benefit that Alfred Tennyson accepted a peerage in 1884, the year Hallam married Audrey Georgiana Florence Boyle (after being disappointed in his love for Mary Gladstone, daughter of William Ewart Gladstone). On his father's death in 1892, he inherited the title Baron Tennyson, and also the role of official biographer. His Tennyson: A Memoir was published in 1897.

== Governor of South Australia ==
Like his father, Tennyson was an ardent imperialist, and in 1883 he had become a council member of the Imperial Federation League, a lobby group set up to support the imperialist ideas of the Colonial Secretary, Joseph Chamberlain. It was this connection, as well as the Tennyson name, that led Chamberlain to offer Tennyson the position of Governor of South Australia in 1899. He was still in this position in May 1902, when the Governor-General of Australia, the Earl of Hopetoun, suddenly announced his intention to resign.

== Governor-General of Australia ==
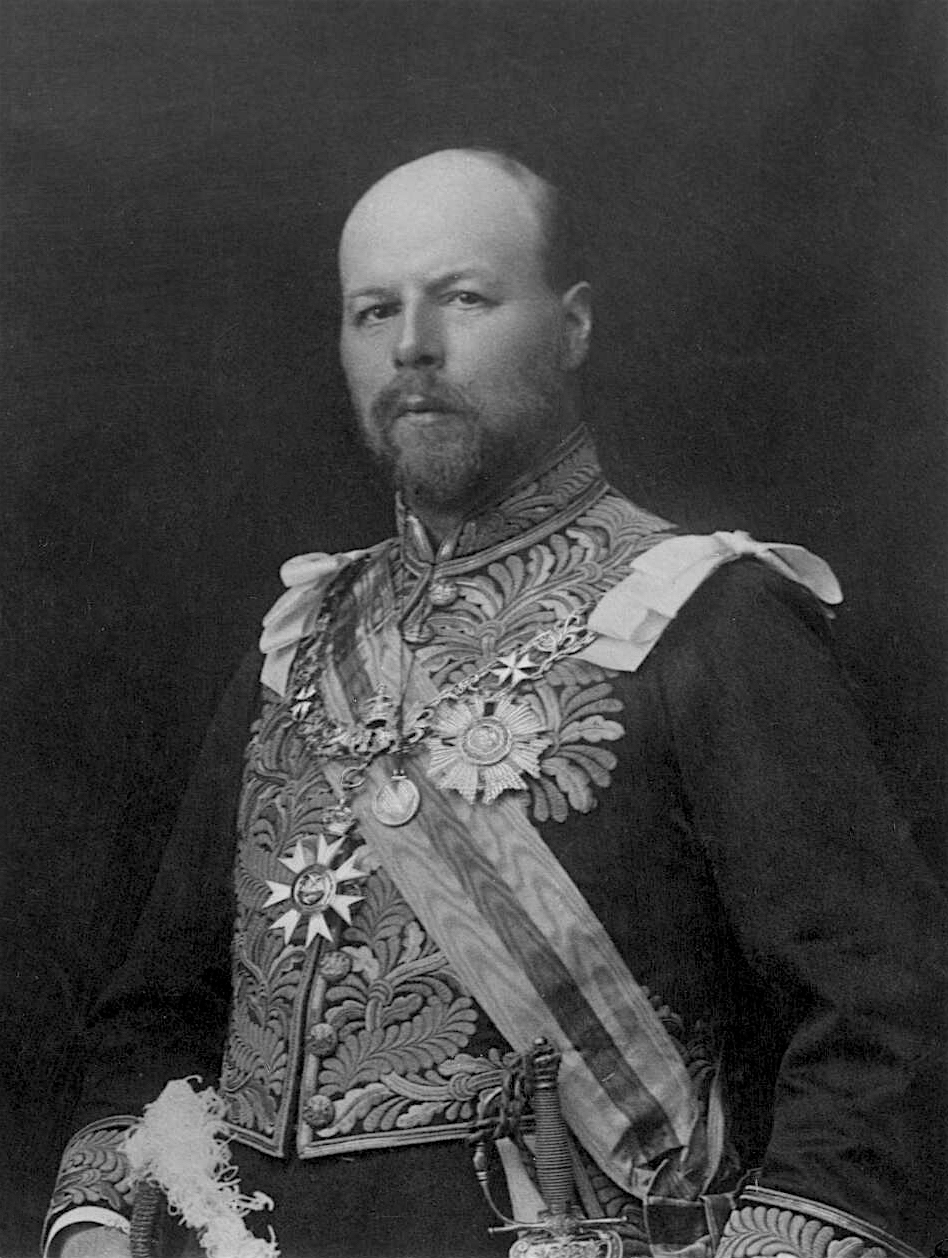
Tennyson in his viceregal uniform

Tennyson was the senior state governor at the time of Hopetoun's announcement, and thus became Administrator of the Government upon his departure from Australia on 17 July 1902. There were some doubts about his ability to fill the job on a permanent basis since he had little experience of politics. But he had made a good impression in Australia through his modesty and frugality, unlike the ostentatiously imperious Hopetoun. In December 1902 he accepted the post for, at his own suggestion, a one-year appointment only.

The new Governor-General was popular and got on with Australians far better than his predecessor had done. But problems arose through the ambiguity of his position. The Prime Minister, Alfred Deakin, insisted that the Governor-General's official secretary must be appointed and paid by the Australian government. The British government objected (privately) because this would mean that the Governor-General could not carry out what was seen in London as his broader role in supervising the Australian government. Tennyson shared this view.

As a result, relations between Deakin and Tennyson grew tense. Deakin correctly suspected that Tennyson was reporting on him to London and trying to interfere on matters of policy, such as the naval agreement between Britain and Australia. For this reason Deakin did not encourage Tennyson to seek an extension of his one-year term. None of this was known to the public and Tennyson left Australia in January 1904 to universal expressions of approval.

== Retirement and death ==
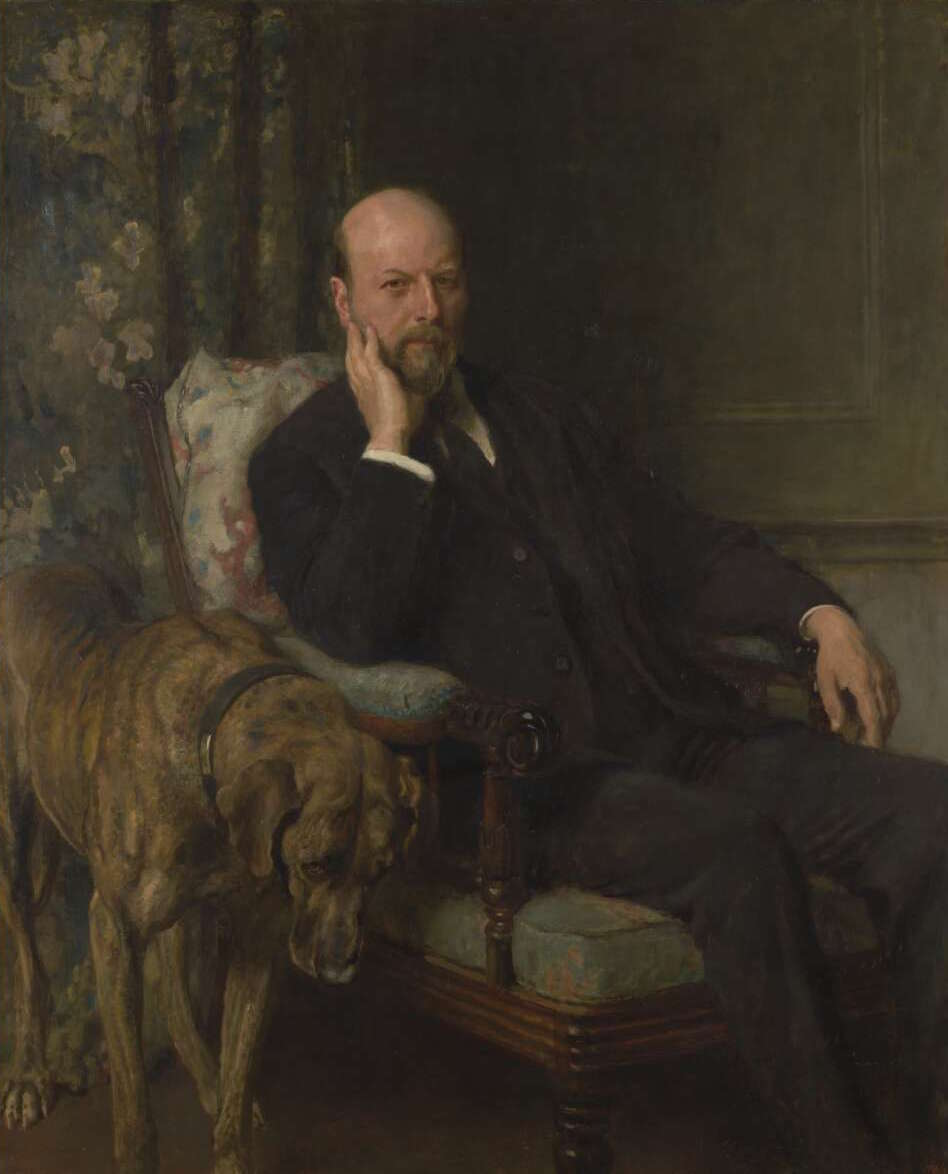
Lord Tennyson (1908, Briton Rivière)

Tennyson spent the rest of his life at Farringford, serving as deputy Governor of the Isle of Wight from 1913. His wife died in 1916, and in 1918 he remarried to Mary "May" Emily Prinsep (1853–1931). She was the daughter of Charles Robert Prinsep, Indian-born Advocate-General of Calcutta and later the owner of a large nutmeg plantation in Singapore, and niece of Sir Henry Thoby Prinsep, who adopted her when she was eleven upon her father's death. Tennyson was May Prinsep's second husband; her first husband was Andrew Hichens (d. 1906). The National Portrait Gallery has eight photographs of May Prinsep, taken by her relative Julia Margaret Cameron on the Isle of Wight.

Tennyson bequeathed many of his father's notebooks to Trinity College in 1924.

He had three sons by his first wife:

- Lionel Hallam Tennyson, 3rd Baron Tennyson (7 November 1889 – 6 June 1951), married Hon. Clare Tennant, daughter of Edward Tennant, 1st Baron Glenconner; remarried to Carroll Donner (née Elting)
- Captain Hon. Alfred Aubrey Tennyson (1891–1918), killed in action during World War I
- Sub-Lieutenant Hon. Harold Courtenay Tennyson (1896–1916), killed in action during World War I

Tennyson died at Farringford on 2 December 1928.

== Commemoration ==
- A large oil portrait of Tennyson hangs in Admiralty House, Kirribilli.
- Tennyson's coat of arms is painted in the entry foyer of Government House, Sydney.
- Tennyson endowed £100 to the University of Adelaide in 1900 to establish the Tennyson Medal, as an award for the student who achieves the highest result in English Literary Studies in the final year of secondary education in South Australia.

== Arms ==
Coat of arms of Hallam Tennyson, 2nd Baron Tennyson
| Crest A dexter arm in armour, the hand in a gauntlet or, grasping a broken tilting spear enfiled with a garland of laurel. Escutcheon Gules, a bend nebuly or, thereon a chaplet vert, between three leopard's heads jessant-de-lys of the second. Supporters Two leopards rampant guardant gules, semée de lys and ducally crowned or. Motto Respiciens Prospiciens (Look backward and forward) Other versions Full achievements: |

Government offices
| Preceded by Sir Thomas Buxton | Governor of South Australia; 1899–1902 | Succeeded by Sir George Le Hunte |
| Preceded by The Marquess of Linlithgow | Governor-General of Australia; 1903–1904 | Succeeded by The Lord Northcote |
Peerage of the United Kingdom
| Preceded by Alfred Tennyson | Baron Tennyson; 1892–1928 | Succeeded by Lionel Tennyson |
