= James M. Beck Jr. =

American businessman and society figure (1892-1972)

James Montgomery Beck Jr.
- Born: April 17, 1892; Philadelphia, Pennsylvania, United States
- Died: December 4, 1972 (aged 80)
- Education: Princeton University
- Spouse(s): Adelaide Wilmerding (m. 1917; div. 1927) Clare Tennant (m. 1928; div. 1939) Mary Ridgely Carter (m. 1945)
- Parents: James M. Beck (father); Lilla Lawrence Mitchell (mother)
- Military career
- Allegiance: United States
- Branch: United States Army
- Service years: 1917-1918
- Rank: First lieutenant
- Unit: Army Signal Corps
- Conflicts: World War I

James Montgomery Beck Jr. (April 17, 1892 – December 4, 1972) was a prominent society figure in New York and Newport.

== Early life ==
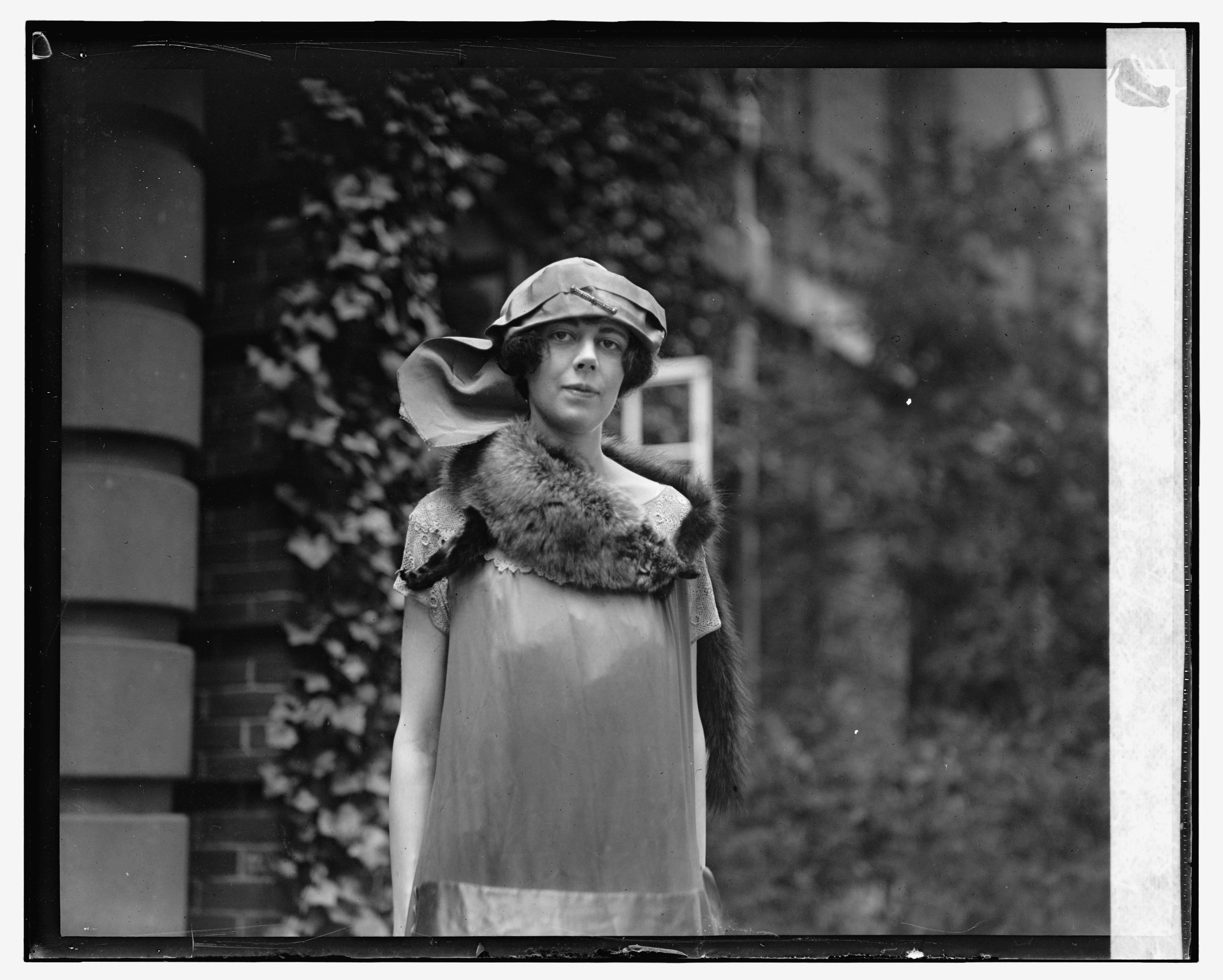
His sister, Beatrice

Beck was born on April 17, 1892, in Philadelphia, Pennsylvania. He was the only son of Lilla Lawrence (née Mitchell) Beck (1861–1956) and James M. Beck (1861–1936), a Republican U.S. Representative from Pennsylvania who served as U.S. Solicitor General under Presidents Warren G. Harding and Calvin Coolidge. His sister, author Beatrice Beck, a friend of the Duke and Duchess of Windsor, was married to foreign service officer Somerville Pinkney Tuck and, following their 1934 divorce, Snowden Andrews Fahnestock (a grandson of banker Harris C. Fahnestock), whom she married in 1936.

His paternal grandparents were Margaretta (née Darling) and James Nathan Beck. His mother was the daughter of James and Emeline Lawrence Mitchell of Philadelphia and, later, Baltimore, Maryland.

Beck graduated from Princeton University in 1914 before serving as First lieutenant in the aviation section of the Army Signal Corps in France in World War I.

== Career ==
In the 1920s, Beck was musical director of the European affiliate of the Victor Talking Machine Company (before it was acquired by the Radio Corporation of America) and, later, a director of Western Electric and representative in England of the Motion Picture Producers and Distributors Association. He was also a founder, and honorary chairman, of the Newport and Miami chapters of the English-Speaking Union, of which he had been a director of the national organization.

In 1956, his third wife established the Newport Music Carnival in Newport, Rhode Island, where they had a home. Through Beck's connections, Mary "brought many stars of the music world to Newport concerts for four summers."

== Personal life ==
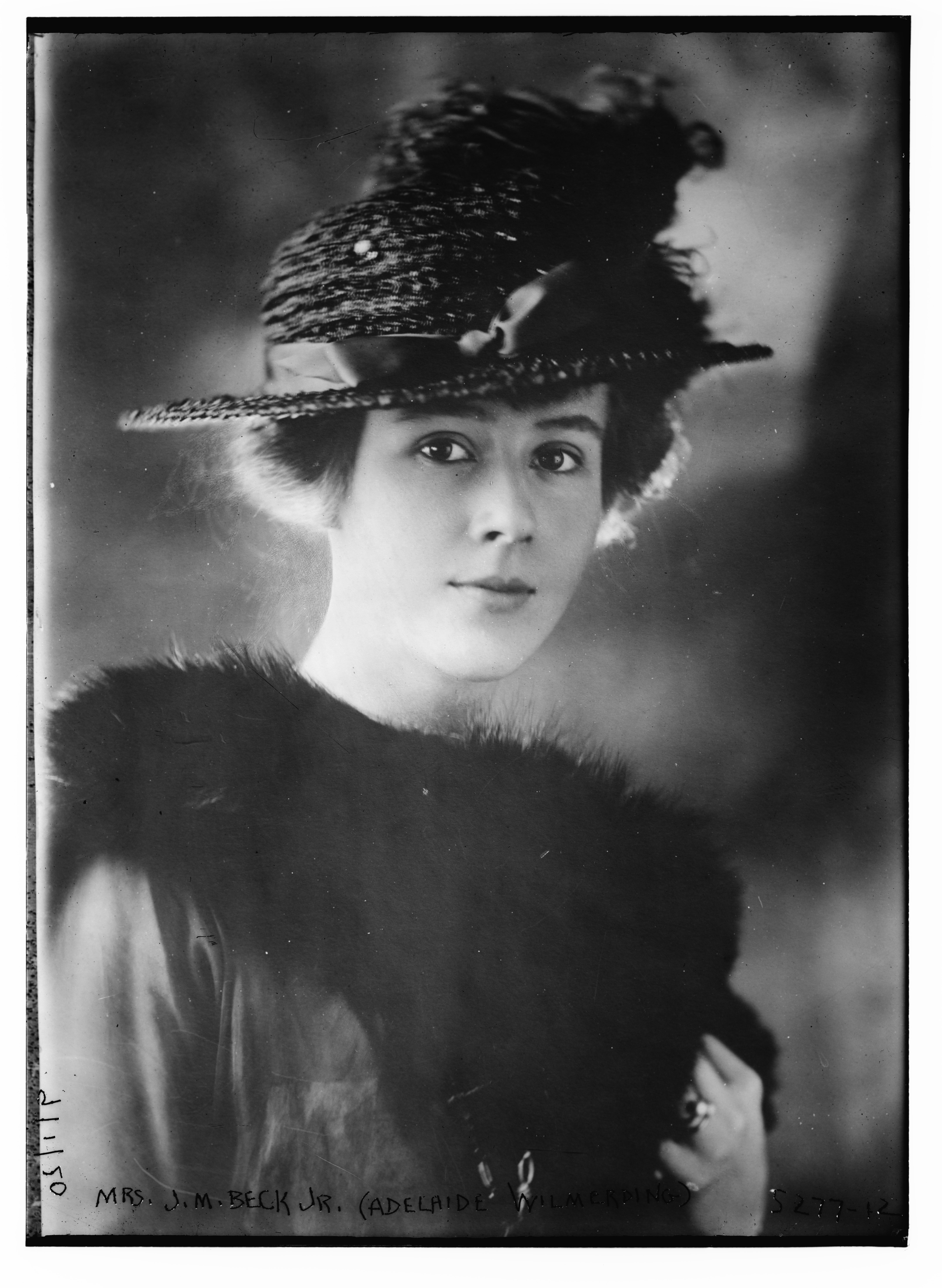
Photograph of his first wife, Adelaide

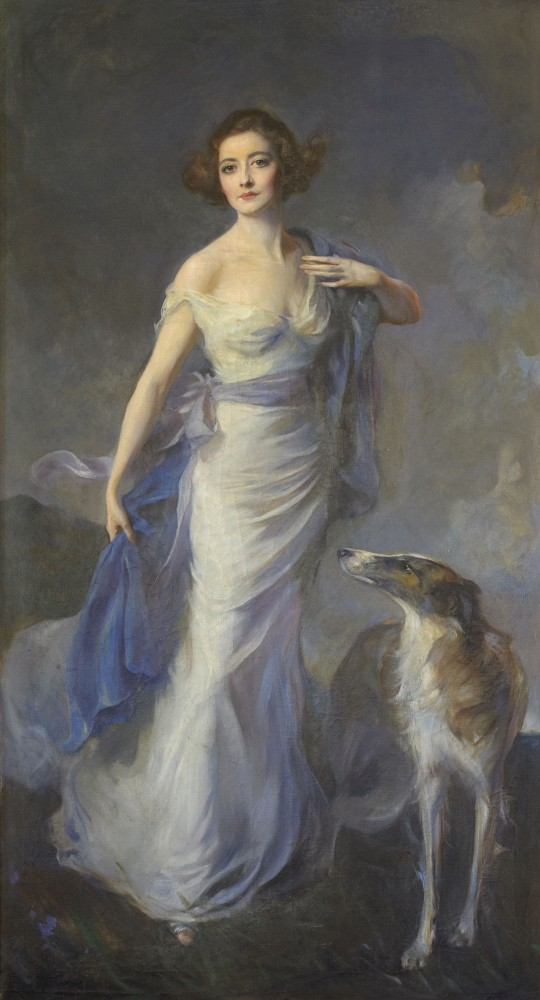
His third wife, Mary Ridgely Carter, portrayed by Philip Alexius de László in 1934

On October 17, 1917, Beck was married to Adelaide Wilmerding, a daughter of Theodore Kearny Wilmerding, at St. Bartholomew's Episcopal Church in New York City. Before their divorce in 1927 in Paris, they were the parents of a daughter:

- Nina Beck, who married Cecil Marais of Lausanne, Switzerland.

On July 24, 1928, Beck was married to The Hon. Clarissa Madeline Georgiana Felicite "Clare" Tennant (1896–1960) in England.<ref">Times, Special to The New York (August 26, 1927). "RUMORE NEW BECK WEDDING; Newport Friends Say James M. Jr. Will Marry Mrs. Tennyson". The New York Times.</ref> Clare was a daughter of Edward Tennant, 1st Baron Glenconner, and the former Pamela Wyndham, and sister of Edward, Stephen and David Tennant. She had previously been married to Capt. Adrian Bethell and Lionel Tennyson, 3rd Baron Tennyson (grandson of poet Alfred, Lord Tennyson), both of whom she divorced. Before their separation in 1936 and divorce in 1939, James and Clare were the parents of twins:

- James Montgomery Beck III (1929–2006), who adopted Reverend David Lawson-Beck.
- Virginia Clare Beck (1929–2008)

In 1945, Beck remarried to Mary Ridgely Carter (1904–1974), a daughter of the Rev. George Calvert Carter (a grandson of George Henry Calvert and great-grandson of George Calvert) and Mary Wray (née Benson) Carter. She was a niece of diplomats Alexander Benson, John Ridgely Carter and a cousin of Mildred, Countess of Gosford. Together, they lived in Newport and at 300 Park Avenue in New York City and were the parents of:

- Edward Ridgely Carter Beck (b. 1948)

Beck died on December 4, 1972, at a hospital in Boston, Massachusetts. His widow died at Plaisance, their home in Newport, in 1976. In 2014, the Beck's son Edward sold Plaisance, their Newport home overlooking an Atlantic-facing cove and Bailey's Beach, for $5,000,000.
