= Matthew Tennyson =

English actor

- Born: Matthew James Tennyson; 1988 (age 37–38); Stoke Newington, London, England
- Education: London Academy of Music and Dramatic Art
- Occupation: Actor
- Father: Jonathan Tennyson
- Family: Tennyson

Matthew James Tennyson (born 1988) is an English actor of stage and screen. He won the Evening Standard Theatre Award for Outstanding Newcomer in 2012.

== Early life and education ==
Tennyson was born in Stoke Newington, London. His father, Jonathan Tennyson, is a physics professor, and his mother, Janice Mary Hopson, is a nurse. He is a grandson of the late radio producer Hallam Tennyson, who took him to the theatre as a child. His paternal grandmother, Margot Wallach, was a Jewish refugee who had fled Nazi Germany. Tennyson is a great-great-great-grandson of poet laureate Alfred, Lord Tennyson.

Tennyson was educated at the London Academy of Music and Dramatic Art (LAMDA), from which he graduated in 2011.

== Career ==
=== Stage ===
Tennyson made his professional stage debut in 2011 under the direction of Trevor Nunn in the role of Percy in Flare Path at the Theatre Royal Haymarket, followed by Jamie in Beautiful Thing at The Royal Exchange for which he received the Best Newcomer award at the 2011 Manchester Theatre Awards. The following year he was the recipient of the 2012 Milton Shulman Award for Outstanding Newcomer at the Evening Standard Awards for his performance as Eric in Making Noise Quietly at the Donmar Warehouse. In 2013 he played Puck in Shakespeare's A Midsummer Night's Dream at Shakespeare's Globe.

In 2017 Tennyson played the title role in the Royal Shakespeare Company's gender-fluid 2017 production of Oscar Wilde's Salomé.

He is a frequent collaborator with the playwright Robert Holman since appearing in the Donmar Warehouse production of his play Making Noise Quietly. He went on to star in Holman's A Breakfast of Eels (2015) and The Lodger (2021). A Breakfast of Eels was written specifically for Tennyson and his co-star Andrew Sheridan. It also won Tennyson an Off West End Award for Best Male Actor in 2016.

In 2018, Tennyson was the lead in the Olivier Award winning A Monster Calls at The Old Vic.

In 2023, Tennyson joined the cast of The Pillowman by Martin McDonagh at The Duke of York's Theatre alongside Steve Pemberton, Lily Allen and Paul Kaye.

In 2024 Tennyson played Edgar in King Lear at the Almeida Theatre directed by Yaël Farber. At the end of that year and into 2025 he starred alongside Simon Russell Beale as the younger A. E. Housman "played both gently and intensely" in the Hampstead Theatre's revival of Stoppard's The Invention of Love.

=== Films and television ===
Tennyson's television roles include Clarence in The Hollow Crown (Henry IV Parts I and II), Ottaviano Riario in Borgia, and Lysander in Russell T Davies's television adaptation of A Midsummer Night's Dream. He has also appeared in the ITV detective dramas Midsomer Murders and Grantchester, and the BBC period drama Father Brown.

Tennyson was featured in the 2014 film Pride, directed by Matthew Warchus. In 2019, he reprised the role of Eric in the film adaptation of Making Noise Quietly directed by Dominic Dromgoole. He played the war poet Wilfred Owen in Terence Davies's 2021 biopic of Siegfried Sassoon, Benediction.

=== Audioplays ===
Tennyson played Jamie Jones, the titular character in the BBC Radio 4 play Jonesy by Tom Wells, broadcast in February 2014. In 2016, he was the voice of Jude in the Amazon Audible drama Romeo and Jude, an adaptation of Romeo and Juliet written by Marty Ross.

== Personal life ==
Tennyson has spoken openly about being gay.

A descendant of Alfred, Lord Tennyson, in 2025, he took part in a special reading of the poet's work, In Memoriam A. H. H., to mark the 175th anniversary of the poem's publication.

== Filmography ==
=== Television ===
Year	Title	Channel/Network	Role	Note/Ref
2006	Midsomer Murders	ITV	Michael Butler	Series 9, episode 6 - "Vixen's Run"
2012	The Hollow Crown	BBC Two and PBS	Clarence	Series 1, episodes 4 and 5 - "Henry IV", Part I and Part II
2013	Da Vinci's Demons	Starz and Fox	Altar Boy	Series 1, episode 1 - "The Hanged Man"
2013-2014	Borgia	Canal+, ZDF, ORF, and Sky Italia	Ottaviano Riario	Series 2 and 3, 3 episodes
2014	Babylon	Channel 4	Counsellor	Series 1, episode 4
2015	Father Brown	BBC One	Thomas Potts	Series 3, episode 6 - "The Upcott Fraternity"
2015	Humans	Channel 4	Howard	Series 1, episode 4
2016	Grantchester	ITV	Kit Bartlett	Series 2, episode 2
2016	A Midsummer Night's Dream	BBC One	Lysander	Television film
2026	Betrayal	ITV	Greg Taylor	Main role

=== Films ===
Year	Title	Role	Note/Ref
2014	Pride	Boy from Printers	
2019	Making Noise Quietly	Eric Baber	
2021	Benediction	Wilfred Owen	
2025	Hamnet	Actor who played Gertrude	

=== Audioplays ===
Year	Title	Station/Network	Role	Note/Ref
2014	Jonesy	BBC Radio 4	Jamie Jones	
2014	Close Call	BBC Radio 4	Vincent	
2014-2015	Home Front	BBC Radio 4	Humphrey Grimes	
2015	Pilgrim	BBC Radio 4	Hartley	Series 6, episode 4
2015	The Sea, The Sea	BBC Radio 4	Titus Fitch	Adaptation of the novel by Iris Murdoch
2016	Romeo and Jude	Audible	Jude	
2017	The Dark Tower	BBC Radio 3	Gavin	2017 remake
2018	Tommies	BBC Radio 4	Harry de Tullio	
2020	Tess of the d'Urbervilles	BBC Radio 4	Angel	
2021	Don Juan	BBC Radio 3	Don Juan	Adaptation of the epic poem by Lord Byron
2026	Lonely No More	Big Finish Productions	TLK	Written by Sebastian Baczkiewicz

=== Theatre ===
Year	Title	Role	Venue/Production	Refs
2011	Flare Path	Percy	Theatre Royal Haymarket	
2011	Beautiful Thing	Jamie	Royal Exchange, Manchester	
2012	Making Noise Quietly (by Robert Holman)	Eric Faber	Donmar Warehouse	
2013	A Midsummer Night's Dream	Puck	Shakespeare's Globe	
2015	A Breakfast of Eels (by Robert Holman)	Penrose	The Coronet	
2015	The Seagull	Konstantin	Regent's Park Open Air Theatre	
2016	Cleansed	Robin	Dorfman Theatre	
2017	Salome	Salome	Swan Theatre, Stratford-upon-Avon	
2018	A Monster Calls	Conor	Bristol Old Vic and The Old Vic, London	
2021	The Lodger (by Robert Holman)	Jude	The Coronet	
2022	The Misfortune of the English (by Pamela Carter)	Lyons	Orange Tree Theatre	
2023	The Pillowman	Michal	Duke of York's Theatre	
2024	King Lear	Edgar	Almeida Theatre	
2024-2025	The Invention of Love	Young A. E. Housman	Hampstead Theatre	
2026	Sanctuary (by Jacob Sparrow)	Michael	The Pleasance	

== Awards ==
Year	Ceremony	Category	Nominated work(s)	Result	Ref.
2012	2011 Manchester Theatre Awards	Best Newcomer	Beautiful Thing	Won	
2012	Evening Standard Theatre Awards	Milton Shulman Award for Outstanding Newcomer	Making Noise Quietly	Won	
2016	Off West End Theatre Awards	Best Male	A Breakfast of Eels	Won	
