= James M. Hazlett =

American politician (1864-1941)

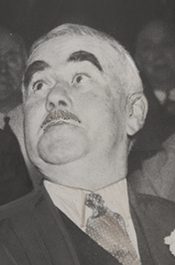

Member of the U.S. House of Representatives from Pennsylvania's 1st district
- In office March 4, 1927 – October 20, 1927
- Preceded by: William Scott Vare
- Succeeded by: James M. Beck

Personal details
- Born: October 14, 1864 Derry, Ireland
- Died: November 8, 1941 (aged 77) Philadelphia, Pennsylvania, U.S.
- Resting place: West Laurel Hill Cemetery, Bala Cynwyd, Pennsylvania, U.S.
- Party: Republican

James Miller Hazlett (October 14, 1864 – November 8, 1941) was an American politician who served as a Republican member of the U.S. House of Representatives for Pennsylvania's 1st congressional district from March 4, 1927 until his resignation on October 20, 1927 prior to Congress convening. He was a member of the Philadelphia Republican political machine led by William Scott Vare and his brothers. He served in several local Philadelphia government roles including on the Philadelphia City Council and as Recorder of Deeds.

== Early life ==
James Hazlett was born October 14, 1864, in Derry, Ireland. At the age of two he immigrated to the United States with his parents who settled in the Southwark neighborhood of Philadelphia, Pennsylvania. He attended the public schools and worked in his father's blacksmith shop in 1881 and as a farrier until 1915.

== Career ==
He was a lieutenant in the Republican political machine led by William Scott Vare and his brothers Edwin and George. In 1896 he was nominated and elected to the Philadelphia Common Council. He served in that role for six years and in the Select Council for four years. He served as president of the Select Council and was nominated to the Board of Judges and as chairman of the Board of Viewers. In 1912, he was nominated to the Board of Views, which fixed properties taken by eminent domain. He became president of the Board of Views and served until 1917. He was elected as Recorder of Deeds in 1914.

He was elected as a Republican to the Seventieth Congress and served until his resignation on October 20, 1927, before the convening of Congress. He never served in Congress nor received any Federal paycheck. Hazlett was elected to the House of Representatives the same time that William Scott Vare was elected to the United States Senate. Hazlett resigned when the Senate refused to seat Vare.

In 1927, he was re-elected Recorder of Deeds and served in that role until 1935. He was elected chairman of the Republican Central Campaign Committee in May 1928 and served until 1934. He was a delegate to the Republican National Conventions in 1928 and 1932. He served as a member of the Board of Road Viewers from November 7, 1935, until he retired on February 23, 1937.

He died of bronchial pneumonia on November 8, 1941, at his home in the Chestnut Hill neighborhood of Philadelphia, and was interred at West Laurel Hill Cemetery in Bala Cynwyd, Pennsylvania.

U.S. House of Representatives
Preceded by William S. Vare	Member of the U.S. House of Representatives from Pennsylvania's 1st congressional district 1927	Succeeded by James M. Beck
