= Harold Tennyson, 4th Baron Tennyson =

British peer (1919–1991)

The Right Honourable The Lord Tennyson

Member of the House of Lords Lord Temporal
- In office 6 June 1961 – 19 October 1991; Hereditary Peerage
- Preceded by: Lionel Tennyson, 3rd Baron Tennyson
- Succeeded by: Mark Tennyson, 5th Baron Tennyson

Personal details
- Born: Hon. Harold Christopher Tennyson; 25 March 1919
- Died: 19 October 1991 (aged 72)
- Parents: Lionel Tennyson, 3rd Baron Tennyson (father); Hon. Clare Tennant (mother)
- Education: Eton College; Trinity College, Cambridge

Harold Christopher Tennyson, 4th Baron Tennyson (25 March 1919 – 19 October 1991), was a British peer.

He was the eldest son of Lionel Tennyson, 3rd Baron Tennyson and Hon. Clare Tennant, his first marriage and her second. Harold was the great-grandson of poet Alfred, Lord Tennyson and succeeded his father to the title in 1951.

He studied at Eton College and Trinity College, Cambridge before joining the War Office in 1940. In later life he was co-founder with Sir Charles Tennyson of the Tennyson Research Centre, Lincoln.

He died unmarried in 1991, the title passing to his brother Mark.

Peerage of the United Kingdom
Preceded by Lionel Tennyson	Baron Tennyson; 1951–1991	Succeeded by Mark Tennyson
