= Wisques =

Wisques Wizeke
- Commune
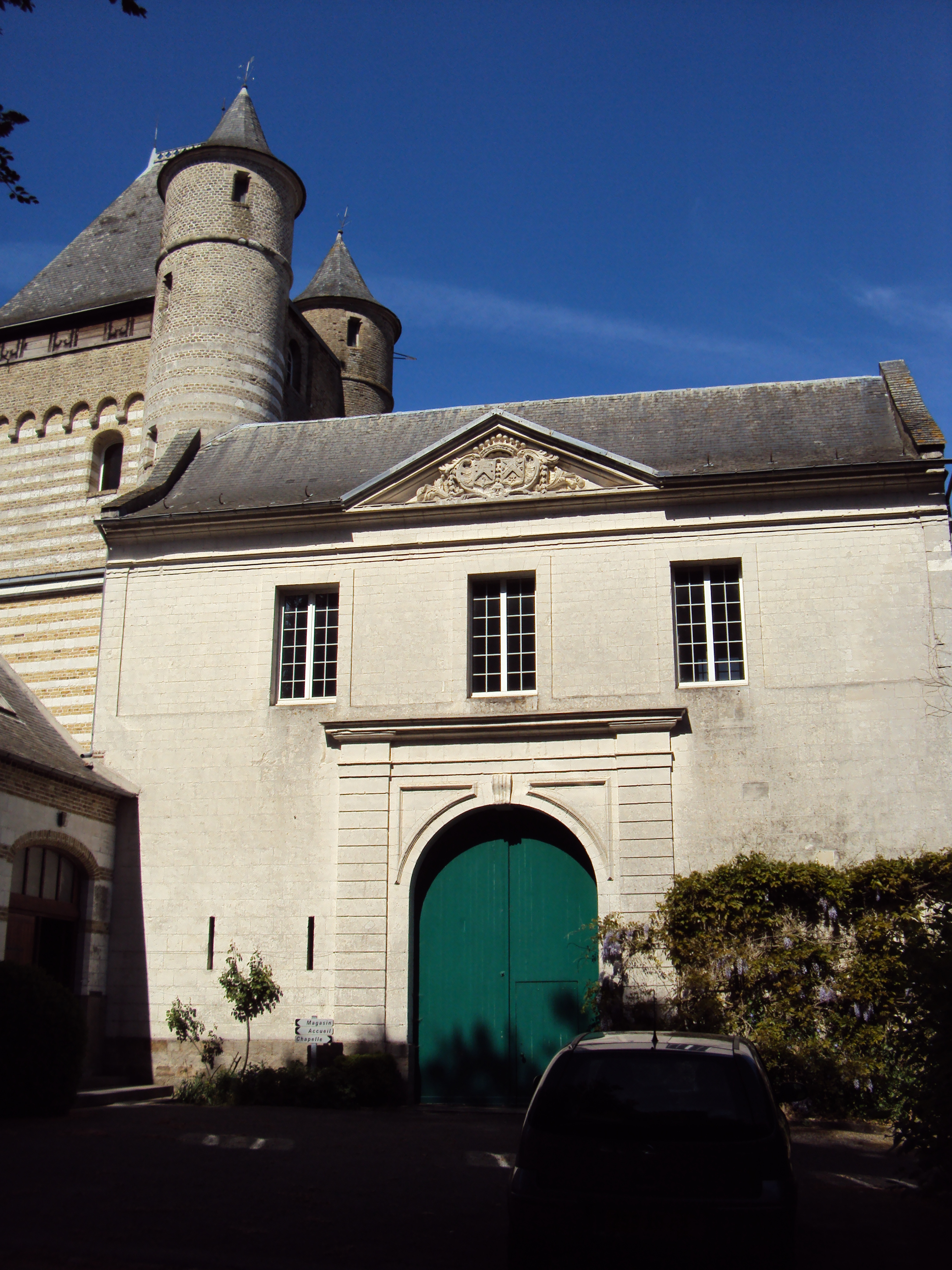
- The abbey of Wisques

- Coat of arms
- Location of Wisques
- Location within France Location within Hauts-de-France
- Coordinates: 50°43′28″N 2°11′36″E
- Country: France
- Region: Hauts-de-France
- Department: Pas-de-Calais
- Arrondissement: Saint-Omer
- Canton: Lumbres
- Intercommunality: Pays de Lumbres

Government
  - Mayor (2020–2026): Gérard Wyckaert
- Area^{1}: 3.74 km^{2} (1.44 sq mi)
- Elevation: 126 m (413 ft)
- Highest elevation: 127 m (417 ft)
- Lowest elevation: 59 m (194 ft)
- Population (2023): 222
  - Density: 59.4/km^{2} (154/sq mi)
- Time zone: UTC+01:00 (CET)
  - Summer (DST): UTC+02:00 (CEST)
- INSEE/Postal code: 62898 /62219
- ^{1} French Land Register data, which excludes lakes, ponds, glaciers > 1 km^{2} (0.386 sq mi or 247 acres) and river estuaries.

Wisques (French pronunciation: [wisk]; Dutch: Wizeke) is a commune in the Pas-de-Calais department in the Hauts-de-France region of France 4 miles (6 km) southwest of Saint-Omer.

== Population ==
Historical population
Year	Pop.	±% p.a.
1968	257	—
1975	228	−1.70%
1982	262	+2.01%
1990	268	+0.28%
1999	235	−1.45%
2007	248	+0.68%
2012	237	−0.90%
2017	226	−0.95%
2023	222	−0.30%
Source: INSEE

== See also ==
- Communes of the Pas-de-Calais department
