= Emily, Lady Tennyson =

British writer and composer (1813–1896)

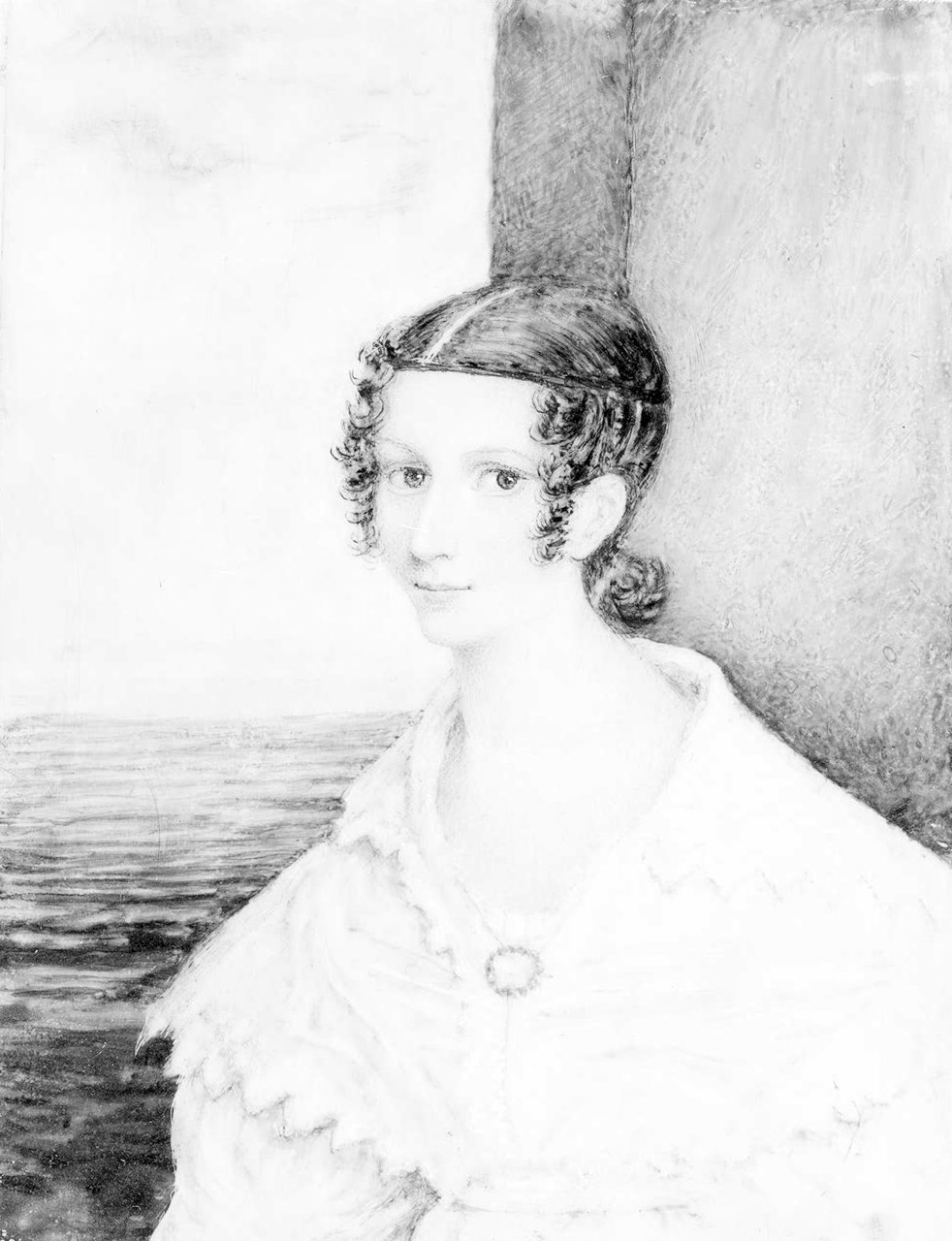
Emily Tennyson, c. 1857, in the collection of the Beinecke Rare Book & Manuscript Library, Yale.

Emily Sarah Tennyson, Baroness Tennyson (née Sellwood; 9 July 1813 – 10 August 1896), known as Emily, Lady Tennyson, was the wife of the poet Alfred, Lord Tennyson, and an author and composer in her own right. Emily was the oldest of three daughters, raised by a single father, after her mother Sarah died when she was three years old. Her father, a successful lawyer, was devoted to her and her sisters and ensured that they had a good education. She met Alfred when she was a girl, but they did not develop a romantic relationship until his brother Charles married her sister Louisa. It was thirteen years before they would marry, due to her father's concerns about the degree to which Tennyson could provide for her on a poet's income. When his career became more successful, Emily and Alfred married.

Emily played a number of significant roles in Alfred's life. Aside from being a wife and mother of two sons, she ran large households and conducted business tasks for her husband. She performed the role of a business manager, secretary, promoter, entertainer, and protector. Her health suffered after the birth of her second child, and stress and overwork caused her health to weaken to the point that she became an invalid. She enjoyed music and wrote settings for some of Tennyson's poetry, and wrote a couple of hymns. After her husband died in 1892, she worked with her son to write a biography of his life.

== Early life ==
Emily Sarah Sellwood was born on 9 July 1813, most likely at Market Place, Horncastle, Lincolnshire, (Note: Some sources cite her place of birth as Berkshire.) the eldest of three daughters born to Sarah (née Franklin, 1788–1816) and Henry Sellwood (1782–1867).

Her father was a prosperous solicitor, secretary, and manager who acted for the Tennyson family many times over the years; her mother was a younger sister of Arctic explorer Sir John Franklin. Her mother died when Emily was three years of age, after which her devoted father provided a good education for the girls.

== Marriage ==
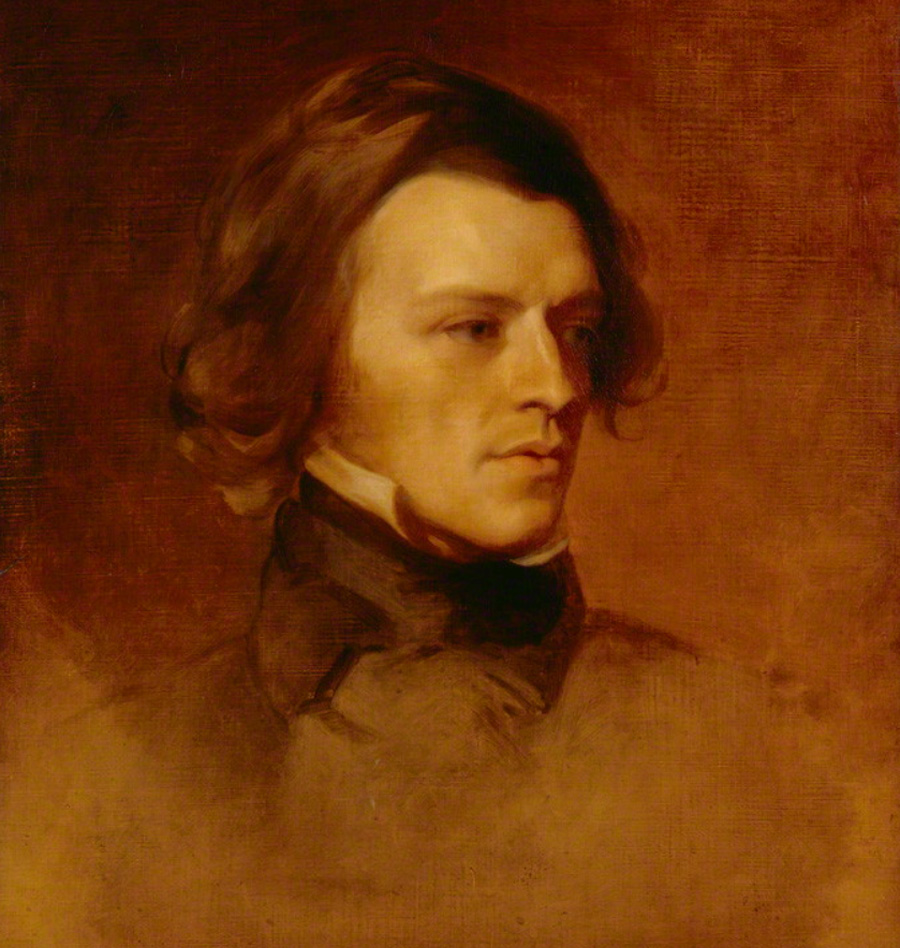
Samuel Laurence, Alfred, Lord Tennyson, 1840

Emily first met Alfred, Lord Tennyson when she was either nine or sixteen. Alfred fell in love with Emily at the marriage of his brother, Charles, to her sister, Louisa, in May 1836. He later wrote a sonnet about how he felt at the wedding of their siblings, where Emily was the bridesmaid:

Love lighted down between them full of glee,

And over his left shoulder laughed at thee,
‘O happy bridesmaid, make a happy bride.’
And all at once a pleasant truth I learn’d,
For while the tender service made thee weep,
I loved thee for the tear thou could’st not hide,
And prest thy hand, and knew the press return’d,
And thought, ‘My life is sick of single sleep:

O happy bridesmaid, make a happy bride!’

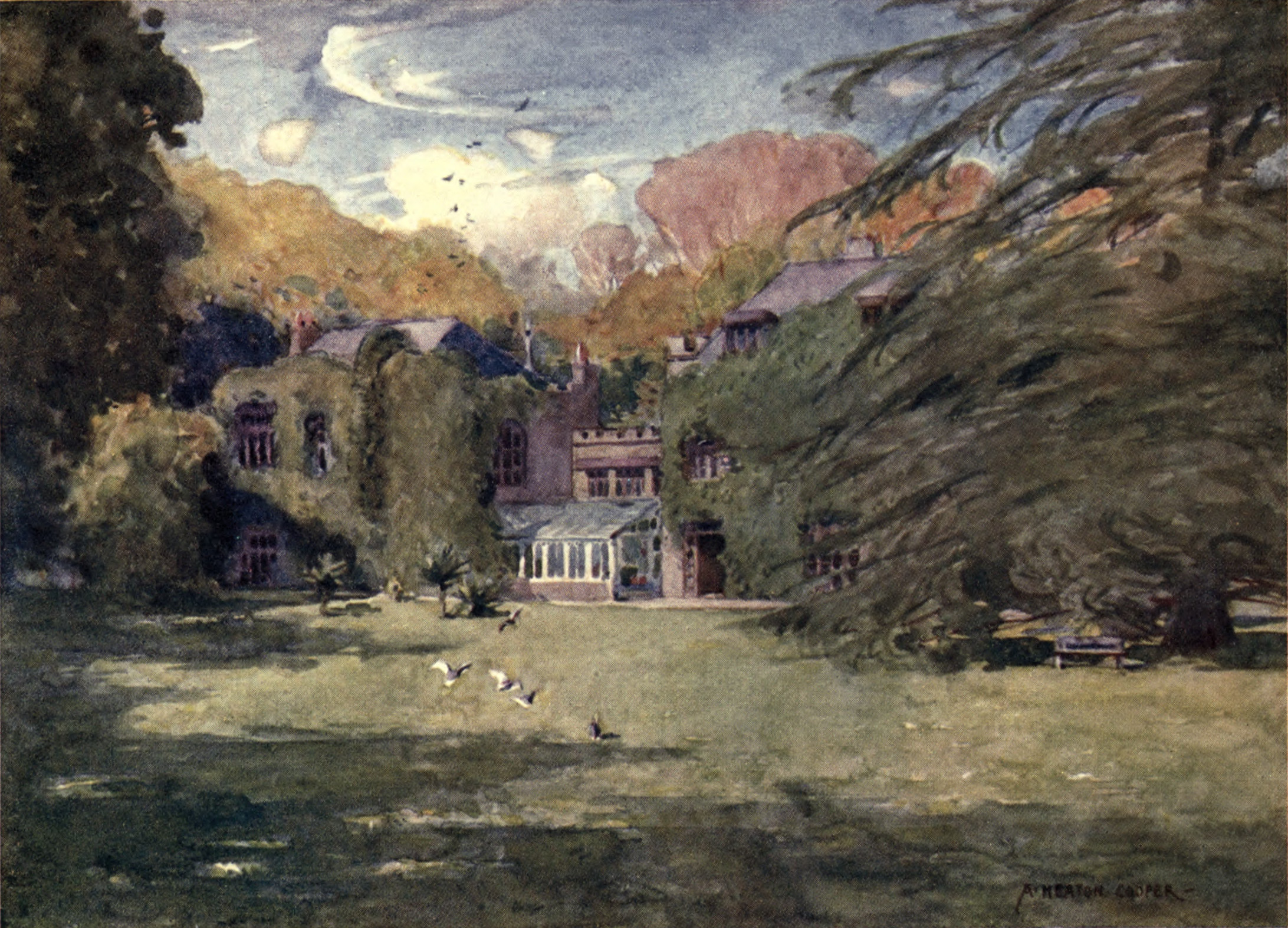
Alfred Heaton Cooper, Farringford House, Isle of Wight

In 1837, they were engaged. It was called off in 1840, because of financial issues and her father's wariness of Tennyson's ability to support a family on a poet's income. Tennyson's career was more successful in the 1840s and they were married on 13 June 1850. She was married at 37 years of age. That year, Alfred was very popular due to the success of In Memoriam A.H.H. (1850), and the attention was overwhelming for Alfred and Emily.

First living in Twickenham in London, they established households in large houses with live-in servants, likely affordable due to a dowry from her father. To avoid the publicity, the Tennysons moved to Freshwater, Isle of Wight to Farringford House. Emily found the house to be the "dearest place on earth", but they had so many visitors that it felt more like a hotel. Their guests often stayed for weeks, which provoked Alfred due to the commotion of servants and guests.

She was his secretary, business partner, proofreader, and financial manager. Philip Larkin described Emily as the woman behind the man — she managed his business, ran his household, took care of and educated his children, entertained visitors, and was protective of him—while he wrote poetry. (Note: Philip Larkin wrote of Emily Tennyson, another poet's wife: Mrs Alfred Tennyson/Answered/begging letters/admiring letters/ insulting letters/enquiring letters/ business letters/and publishers' letters./She also/looked after his clothes/saw to his food and drink/ entertained visitors/protected him from gossip and criticism/And finally/(apart from running the household)/ Brought up and educated his children./While all this was going on/Mister Alfred Tennyson sat like a baby/Doing his poetic business.) Her correspondence provides insight into her managerial abilities and love for her husband. In modern times, her work for her husband would be considered that of a business woman.

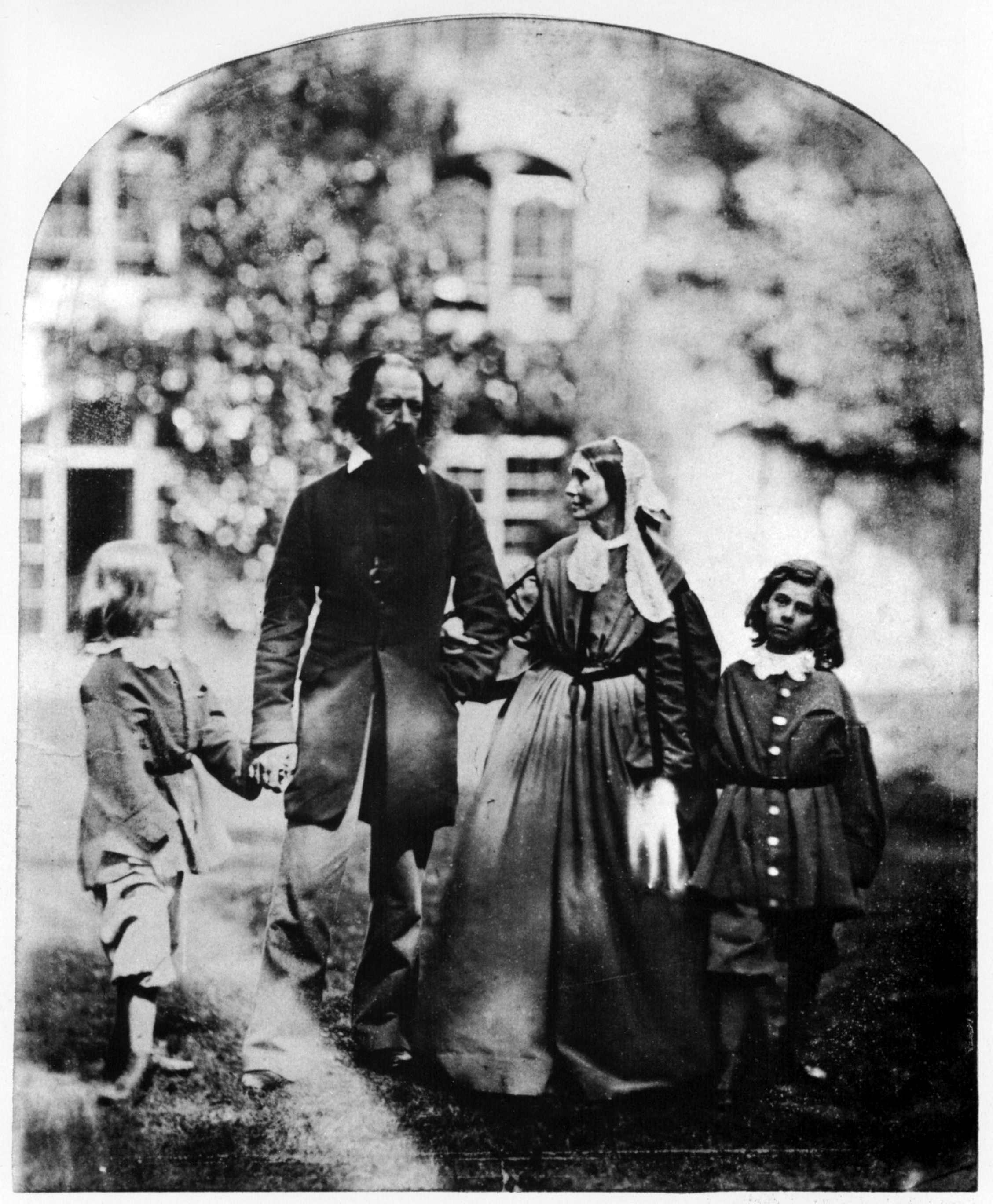
Oscar Gustave Rejlander, Alfred, Lord Tennyson and Emily Tennyson with their sons at Farringford House, Reading Museum

They had two sons, Hallam, born at Twickenham on 11 August 1852, and Lionel, born at Farringford House on 16 March 1854. After the birth of her second son, she developed an incurable illness.

When Alfred was away, Julia Margaret Cameron visited Emily at Farringford. Julia thought of Emily as a "living stream of love whose fount is never dry." She was described by Coventry Patmore as cultivated, charming 'but her mind seems always deeper than her cultivation, and her heart always deeper than her mind, - or rather constituting the main element of her mind."

== Music and writing ==
A musician, Emily employed her own talents in setting some of his poems to music. She wrote the hymns Great God, who knowest each man's need and O yet we trust that somehow good. Emily and her son Hallam wrote a memoir of Tennyson.

== Later years and death ==
Over time, the degree of responsibility was so stressful that it weakened her health. She longed for periods "for reading and thinking, to restore the elasticity of one's mind, now too like a bow spoilt by long bending". She became an invalid and was no longer able to entertain or perform managerial and secretarial duties, as she had in the past. This was in some ways a blessing to Alfred, with both of them going into retirement. She was able, though, to offer him comfort when he was upset.

Alfred died in 1892. He was buried at Westminster Abbey in Poets' Corner. Emily Tennyson died on 10 August 1896 at Aldworth. She is buried in All Saints' Church, Freshwater, Isle of Wight.
