= Sir Gervais Tennyson-d'Eyncourt, 2nd Baronet =

British baronet (1902–1971)

Sir Eustace Gervais Tennyson d'Eyncourt, 2nd Baronet FRSA (19 January 1902 – 21 November 1971).

== Early life ==
Tennyson d'Eyncourt was the son of Sir Eustace Tennyson d'Eyncourt, 1st Baronet, and of his wife Janet (died 1909), the elder daughter of Mathew Finlay, of Langside, Glasgow, and the widow of John Burns.

He was educated at Charterhouse School.

== Career ==
In 1951 he succeeded his father in the baronetcy. He became a Fellow of the Royal Society of Arts in 1956 and was Prime Warden of the Worshipful Company of Fishmongers, 1960–1961, later President of the Shellfish Association of Great Britain, 1971. He was a member of the Executive Committee of the Standing Council of the Baronetage, of the Smeatonian Society of Civil Engineers, the Royal Institution, the Pilgrims, and the Tennyson Society.

== Family ==
Tennyson d'Eyncourt married Pamela Gladstone, the younger daughter of William Buckley Gladstone, of Moor Town House, Ringwood, Hampshire, at St Margaret's, Westminster, on 1 June 1926, and they had two sons and one daughter, Philippa, who married Nigel Nicolson. He married secondly, in 1964, Vinnie Lorraine, the widow of Robert J. O'Donnell and younger daughter of Andrew Pearson, of Minneapolis, Minnesota, US.

Tennyson d'Eyncourt was succeeded in the baronetcy by his son, Jeremy.

Baronetage of the United Kingdom
Preceded by Eustace Tennyson d'Eyncourt	Baronet (of Carter's Corner Farm); 1951–1971	Succeeded by Jeremy Tennyson-d'Eyncourt
