= James M. Beck =

American lawyer and politician (1861–1936)

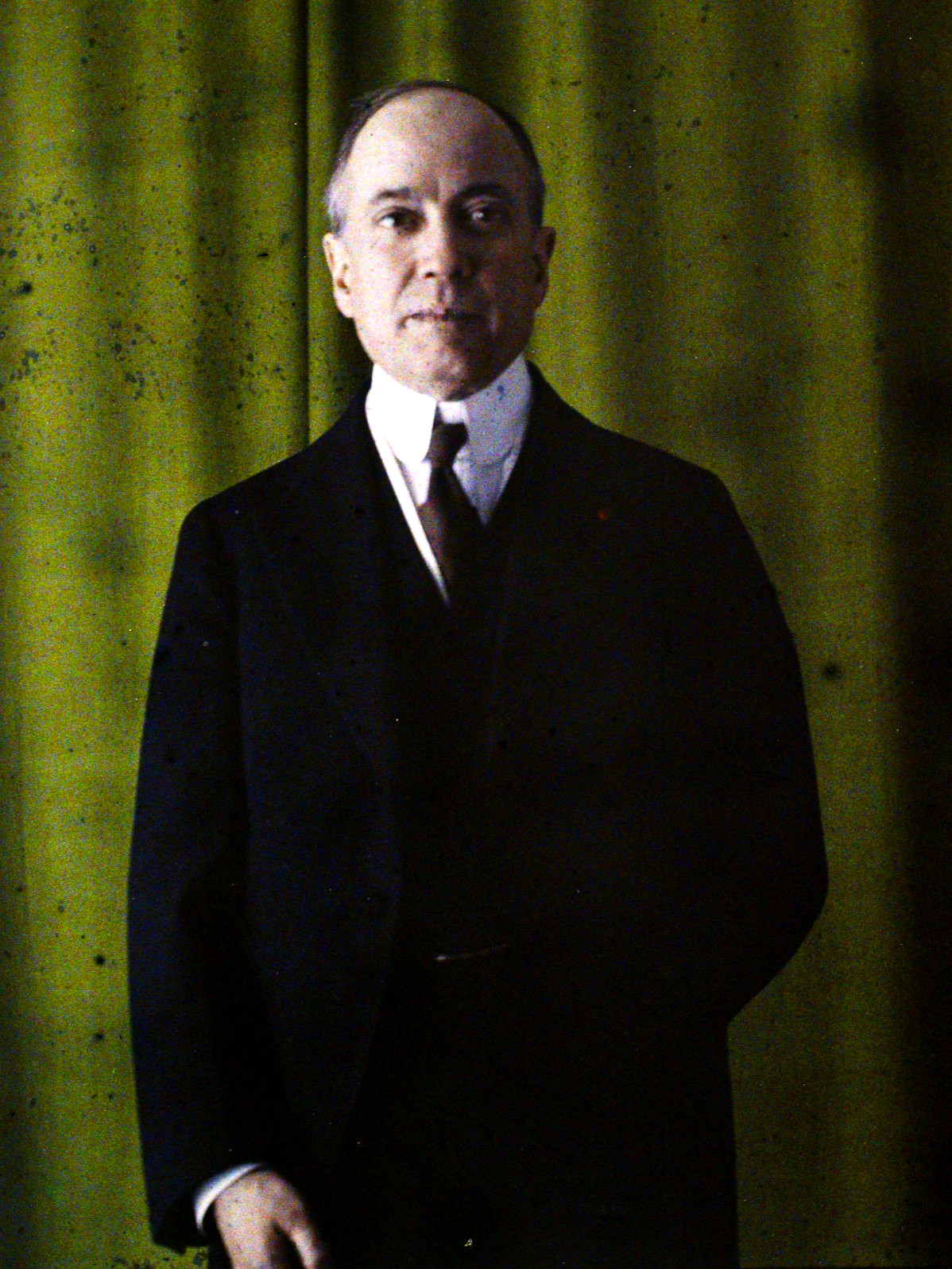
- 1922 Autochrome by Auguste Léon

Member of the U.S. House of Representatives from Pennsylvania
- In office November 8, 1927 – September 30, 1934
- Preceded by: James M. Hazlett
- Succeeded by: William H. Wilson
- Constituency: 1st district (1927–1933); 2nd district (1933–1934)

17th United States Solicitor General
- In office June 1, 1921 – May 11, 1925
- President: Warren G. Harding; Calvin Coolidge
- Preceded by: William L. Frierson
- Succeeded by: William D. Mitchell

9th United States Assistant Attorney General
- In office 1900–1903
- President: William McKinley; Theodore Roosevelt
- Preceded by: James Edmund Boyd
- Succeeded by: James Clark McReynolds

Personal details
- Born: James Montgomery Beck; July 9, 1861 Philadelphia, Pennsylvania, U.S.
- Died: April 12, 1936 (aged 74) Washington, D.C., U.S.
- Resting place: Rock Creek Cemetery; Washington, D.C., U.S.
- Party: Republican
- Other political affiliations: Democratic (before 1900)
- Education: Moravian College
- Profession: Lawyer

James Montgomery Beck (July 9, 1861 – April 12, 1936) was an American lawyer, politician, and author from Philadelphia, Pennsylvania. He was a member of the Republican Party, who served as U.S. Solicitor General and U.S. Representative from Pennsylvania.

== Early life and education ==
Beck was born July 9, 1861, in Philadelphia, the son of Margaretta C. (née Darling) and James Nathan Beck. In 1880, he graduated from Moravian College in Bethlehem, Pennsylvania. He was employed as clerk for a railway company in 1880 and studied law at night, was admitted to the bar in 1884 and commenced practice in Philadelphia. He was admitted to the bar of New York City in 1903, and to the bar of England in 1922.

== Career ==
Beck served as assistant United States Attorney for the eastern district of Pennsylvania from 1888 to 1892 and as United States attorney in Philadelphia from 1896 to 1900. In 1898, he ran for District Attorney of Philadelphia, but lost to P. Frederick Rothermel. Switching from a Pro-Cleveland Democrat to a Republican in 1900, he was appointed by President William McKinley as Assistant Attorney General of the U.S. at the U.S. Department of Justice in the same year, where he served until his resignation in 1903. He then returned to the full-time practice of law, joining the firm of Shearman & Sterling in New York City. In 1917, he left that firm to become senior partner in Beck, Crawford & Harris, and retired from active practice in 1927 to run for Congress from Philadelphia.

At the outbreak of World War I, he took a strong stand against the German Empire in extensive writings and addresses. He was elected a bencher of Gray's Inn in 1914, the first foreigner in 600 years to receive that distinction. He also received decorations from France and Belgium and authored several books and articles on World War I and on the Constitution of the United States. Among his books are The Evidence in the Case (1914) and War and Humanity (1916).

Beck was an elected member of the American Philosophical Society (1926).

=== Solicitor General ===
He was appointed by President Warren G. Harding as Solicitor General of the United States in 1921 and served until his voluntary resignation in 1925, when he again resumed the practice of law. During his term as solicitor general, he had charge of more than 800 cases before the U.S. Supreme Court. He personally and successfully argued more than 100 of these cases, including Ozawa v. United States.

His conservative views are reflected in his 1924 book The Constitution of the United States, which was a best-seller and went through seven printings in ten months. A special edition of 10,000 copies, with a foreword written by President-elect Calvin Coolidge, was distributed to schools and libraries across the country.

=== U.S. Representative ===
After resigning as solicitor general, Beck became involved in the legal fight of William S. Vare, who was elected to the U.S. Senate but denied a seat because of irregularities in the election. In response, Beck wrote The Vanishing Rights of States in which he argued that the U.S. Constitution did not permit the U.S. Senate to exclude a member chosen through an election. The debate that followed the book's publishing, raising Beck's public profile and making him a prominent option to fill the U.S. House seat vacated by the resignation of James M. Hazlett.

Beck was elected to the Seventieth Congress, was reelected to the Seventy-first, Seventy-second, and Seventy-third Congresses and served from November 8, 1927, until his resignation on September 30, 1934.

He was active in the movement to repeal the Eighteenth Amendment, which he said had no place in the constitution. He also fended off legal questions about his official residence and thus eligibility to represent Philadelphia.

=== Legal battles ===
Beck resigned his seat in the House of Representatives over strong objections to President Franklin Roosevelt's New Deal. In a statement released at the time of his resignation, he stated that Congress had become "merely a rubber stamp for the Executive."

He joined the lawsuit against the New Deal-created Tennessee Valley Authority and argued the case in the Supreme Court in December 1935, declaring the organization unconstitutional and socialistic. In the final weeks before his death, he served as counsel in the case of an oil stock dealer accused of violating the Securities Act of 1933.

== Personal life ==
Beck was married to Lilla Lawrence Mitchell (1861–1956), the daughter of James and Emeline Lawrence Mitchell of Philadelphia and later of Baltimore. They had two children together:

- James Montgomery Beck Jr. (1892–1972) who married The Hon. Clarissa "Clare" Tennant (1896–1960), a daughter of Edward Tennant, 1st Baron Glenconner and the former Pamela Wyndham. After their divorce, he married Mary Ridgely Carter.
- Beatrice Beck (1897–1980), who married foreign service officer Somerville Pinkney Tuck in 1924. After their 1934 divorce, she married Snowden Andrews Fahnestock (a grandson of banker Harris C. Fahnestock), in 1936.

== Death ==
Beck died April 12, 1936, in Washington, D.C., at age 74, and is buried at Rock Creek Cemetery in Washington, D.C. Beck's widow, Lilla Lawrence Mitchell, died over 20 years later, on August 1, 1956.

Awards and achievements
Preceded by Fuad I of Egypt	Cover of Time Magazine; 5 May 1923	Succeeded by John Barton Payne
U.S. House of Representatives
Preceded by James M. Hazlett	Member of the U.S. House of Representatives from Pennsylvania's 1st congressional district 1927–1933	Succeeded by Harry C. Ransley
Preceded by Edward L. Stokes	Member of the U.S. House of Representatives from Pennsylvania's 2nd congressional district 1933–1934	Succeeded by William H. Wilson
