= Sir Eustace Tennyson-d'Eyncourt, 1st Baronet =

British naval architect and engineer (1868–1951)

Sir Eustace Tennyson d'Eyncourt Bt KCB FRS
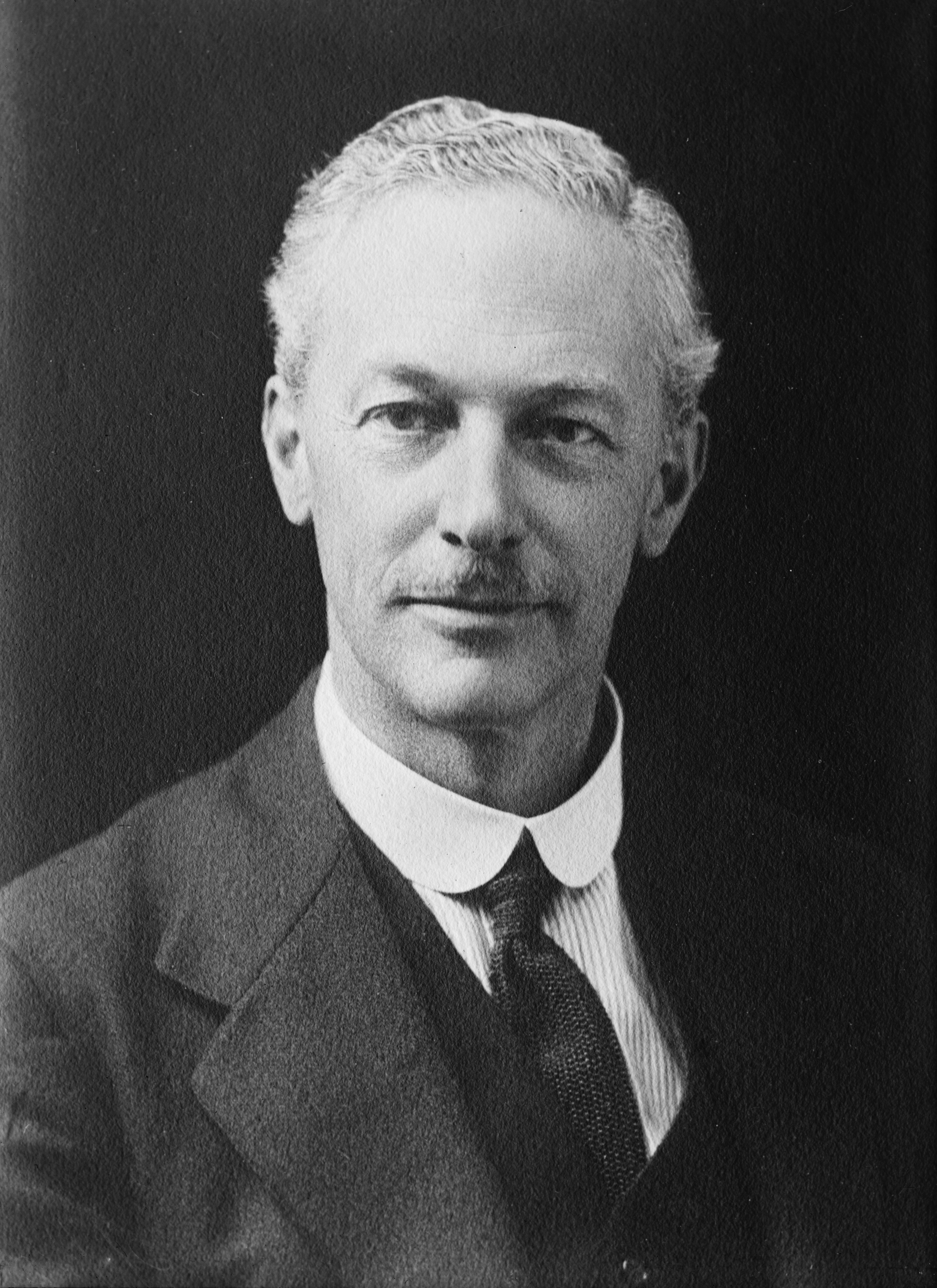
- Born: Eustace Henry William Tennyson d'Eyncourt; 1 April 1868; Hadley House, Barnet, Hertfordshire
- Died: 1 February 1951 (aged 82); Westminster, London
- Education: Charterhouse
- Known for: Director of Naval Construction
- Spouse(s): Janet Watson Finlay (married 1898, Anderston, Scotland)
- Awards: Fellow of the Royal Society

Chairman of the Landships Committee
- In office 20 February 1915 – 1916

Director of Naval Construction
- In office 1912–1924
- Preceded by: Sir Philip Watts
- Succeeded by: Sir William Berry

Vice-President of the Tank Board
- In office 1918–1919

Sir Eustace Henry William Tennyson d'Eyncourt, 1st Baronet (1 April 1868 – 1 February 1951), was a British naval architect and engineer. As Director of Naval Construction for the Royal Navy, 1912–1924, he was responsible for the design and construction of some of the most famous British warships. He was also chairman of the Landship Committee at the Admiralty, which was responsible for the design and production of the first military tanks to be used in warfare.

== Personal life ==
D'Eyncourt was born in April 1868 at Hadley House, Barnet, Hertfordshire. He was the sixth child of Louis Charles Tennyson d'Eyncourt (1814–1896) and his wife Sophia Yates (d. 1900). Through his father, he was a cousin of Alfred, Lord Tennyson.

He was educated at Charterhouse, then became an apprentice in naval architecture at the shipyard of Armstrong, Whitworth & Co. in Elswick. By 1898, he was employed as a naval architect at the Fairfield Shipbuilding and Engineering Company in Govan, Glasgow. There he met Janet Burns (née Watson Finlay), a widow whom he married that same year. She had two children from her first marriage, Kingsley and Gwyneth; she and d'Eyncourt had a son, Gervais, and a daughter, Cecily. Janet Tennyson d'Eyncourt died in 1909 when accompanying her husband on a business trip to Buenos Aires.

D'Eyncourt received a number of awards and honours: in 1913, elected to the Athenaeum; in 1921, elected a Fellow of the Royal Society; in 1930, created a baronet; and in 1946, elected a fellow of the Royal Society of Arts. He was succeeded in the baronetcy by his son Gervais (d. 1971). The writer Adam Nicolson is Eustace d'Eyncourt's great-grandson.

== Career ==
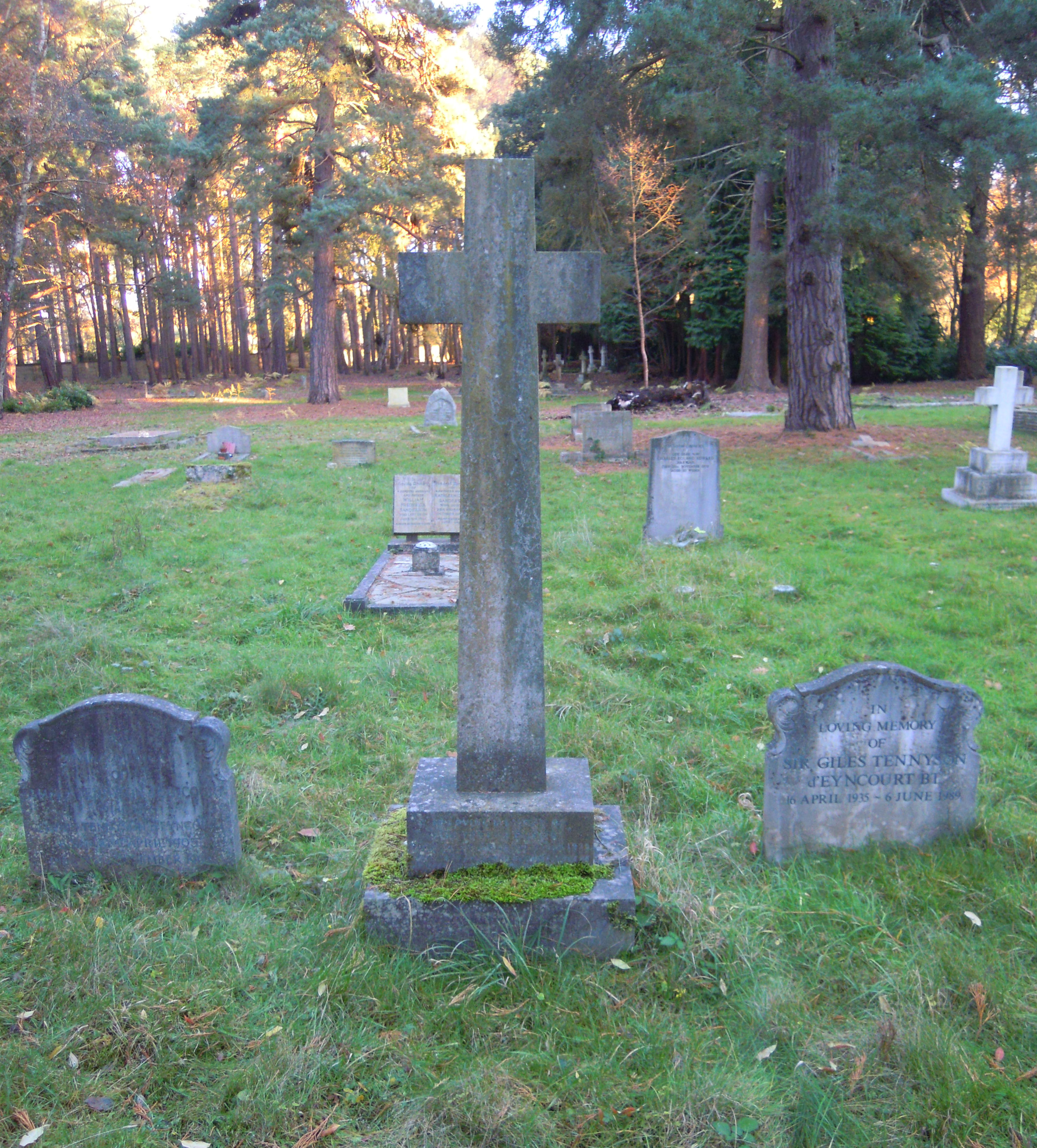
Grave of Eustace Tennyson d'Eyncourt (central cross) in Brookwood Cemetery

As an apprentice at Armstrong, Whitworth & Co., d'Eyncourt worked on the design of warships for the Austrian, Italian, Norwegian, Spanish, Portuguese, and Turkish governments. He joined the Fairfield Shipbuilding and Engineering Company of Govan in 1898, before returning to Armstrong, Whitworth & Co. in 1902. In 1904, he undertook consultancy work on the state of the Turkish Navy which earned him the Order of the Medjidie, Third Class.

In 1912, d'Eyncourt was appointed Director of Naval Construction with the Royal Navy. He pioneered new forms of ship construction that helped provide protection from torpedo attack.

On 20 February 1915, First Lord of the Admiralty Winston Churchill asked him to be Chairman of the Landship Committee, a group of Royal Naval Air Service officers and engineers assembled to design a vehicle capable of crossing No Man's Land and suppressing the enemy machine guns that had caused heavy casualties in the first six months of the First World War. The machine that was eventually developed was given the name "tank".

D'Eyncourt resigned from the Admiralty in 1924 and rejoined his former company, Armstrong, Whitworth & Co. However, the firm failed in the late 1920s owing to the building slump following the end of the war. In 1928, d'Eyncourt joined the board of Parsons Marine Steam Turbine Company until he retired in 1948. He lived for most of his retirement in Hailsham, Sussex, but died in London in 1951.

He is buried in Brookwood Cemetery.

== Design characteristics ==
In his battlecruisers, "large light cruisers" and the Hawkins-class cruisers, d'Eyncourt evolved a novel hull form: in cross-section the hull was an isosceles trapezoid, with the ship's sides sloping inboard at an angle of 10 degrees from the vertical, while outboard of this, external bulges extended over the full length of the machinery spaces. The result was a hull structure of great strength, and the sloping sides increased the possible spread of impact of shells, thus giving greater resistance to penetration.

The aesthetic side of naval architecture has seldom been given much attention, though it is as much of an art as the architecture of buildings; in general appearance (in terms of harmonious proportion as regards length, beam, and freeboard, as well as the size of the superstructure and funnels in relation to the hull), the opinion has been expressed that d'Eyncourt created some of the most elegant and eye-pleasing warships ever designed, the prime example being the battle cruiser HMS Hood.

== Ship designs ==
D'Eyncourt was not necessarily the principal designer of the vessels listed below, but had ultimate responsibility for them.

=== Battleships and battlecruisers ===
- Brazilian battleship, later HMS Agincourt
- Turkish battleship, later HMS Erin
- Chilean battleships Almirante Latorre, later HMS Canada and Almirante Cochrane, later HMS Eagle (aircraft carrier)
- Revenge-class battleship
- Renown-class battlecruiser
- HMS Hood battlecruiser
- Several very large capital ship designs, both battleships and battlecruisers, rendered inadmissible under the Washington Naval Treaty
- Nelson-class battleship

=== Cruisers ===
- GRC Katsonis
  - HMS Chester
- Arethusa class (1913)
- C class (1912–17)
  - Caroline class
  - Calliope class
  - HMS Champion
  - Cambrian class
  - Centaur class
  - Caledon class
  - Ceres class
  - Carlisle class
- Hawkins-class large cruisers (1915)
- Danae-class cruisers (1916–18)
  - HMS Danae
  - HMS Dragon
  - HMS Diomede
- HMS Enterprise (Emerald-class cruiser)) (1917–18)
- HMS Kent (County-class cruiser) (1923–24)

=== "Large light cruisers", later aircraft carriers ===
- HMS Courageous
- HMS Furious

=== Destroyers ===
- R and S-class destroyers
- V and W-class destroyers
- Scott-class flotilla leaders

=== Submarines ===
- J class
- K class

=== Other types ===
Monitors, patrol boats, minesweepers, sloops, gunboats for China Station, Merchant ship conversions into seaplane carriers

=== Tanks ===
D'Eyncourt was chairman of the Landship Committee, created by Winston Churchill, which oversaw the design and production of Britain's first military tanks during World War 1.

== Writings ==
D'Eyncourt summarized his World War I work in an article "Naval Construction During the War", published in Engineering, 11 April 1919, pp. 482–490. He also published an autobiography entitled A Shipbuilder's Yarn (London: Hutchinson, 1948).

== Bibliography ==
- Churchill, Winston. The World Crisis (Abridged). 1992; Macmillan Publishing Company. ISBN 0-684-19453-8.
- Leigh Rayment's list of baronets
- D'Eyncourt. A Shipbuilder's Yarn; The Record of a Naval Constructor (London: Hutchinson, 1948).

Baronetage of the United Kingdom
New creation	Baronet of Carter's Corner Farm; 1930–1951	Succeeded by Gervais Tennyson-d'Eyncourt
