= Mark Tennyson, 5th Baron Tennyson =

British peer

Commander The Right Honourable The Lord Tennyson DSC

Member of the House of Lords
- Lord Temporal
- In office 19 October 1991 – 11 November 1999 as a hereditary peer
- Preceded by: Harold Tennyson, 4th Baron Tennyson
- Succeeded by: Seat abolished (Note: Pursuant to the House of Lords Act 1999.)

Personal details
- Born: Mark Aubrey Tennyson; 28 March 1920
- Died: 3 July 2006 (aged 86)
- Spouse: Deline Celeste Budler (m. 1964; died 1995)
- Parents: Lionel Tennyson, 3rd Baron Tennyson (father); Hon. Clare Tennant (mother)

Commander Mark Aubrey Tennyson, 5th Baron Tennyson (28 March 1920 – 3 July 2006), was a British peer. He was the second son of Lionel Tennyson, 3rd Baron Tennyson, and the Hon. Clare Tennant. The great-grandson of poet Alfred, Lord Tennyson, he succeeded his brother to the title in 1991.

Tennyson served in the Royal Navy from 1937 to 1960, rising to the rank of commander, and saw action during World War II. He was mentioned in dispatches in 1945 in recognition of his military service during the war. He was subsequently an executive of Rowntree Mackintosh and Joseph Terry & Sons. In 1964, he married Deline Celeste Budler (d. 1995). The two had no children.

== Notes ==
Peerage of the United Kingdom
Preceded by Harold Tennyson	Baron Tennyson; 1991–2006; Member of the House of Lords (1991–1999)	Succeeded by David Tennyson
