= Lionel Tennyson, 3rd Baron Tennyson =

English cricketer (1889–1951)

Lionel Tennyson
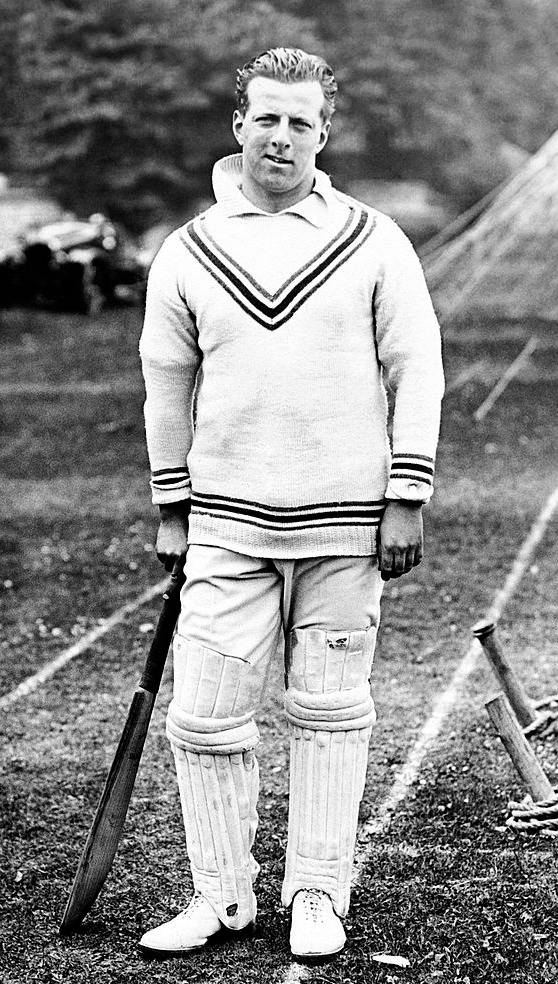
- Tennyson pictured in about 1922

Personal information
- Full name: Lionel Hallam Tennyson
- Born: 7 November 1889; Westminster, London, England
- Died: 6 June 1951 (aged 61); Bexhill-on-Sea, Sussex, England
- Batting: Right-handed
- Bowling: Right-arm fast
- Relatives: Alfred Tennyson (grandfather); Audrey Tennyson (mother); Hallam Tennyson (father); Clare Tennant (wife); Harold Tennyson (son); Mark Tennyson (son)

International information
- National side: England
- Test debut (cap 180): 13 December 1913 v South Africa
- Last Test: 16 August 1921 v Australia

Domestic team information
- Years: Team
- 1913–1935: Hampshire

Career statistics
Competition	Test	First-class
Matches	9	477
Runs scored	345	16,828
Batting average	31.36	23.33
100s/50s	0/4	19/66
Top score	74*	217
Balls bowled	6	3,756
Wickets	0	55
Bowling average	–	54.10
5 wickets in innings	–	0
10 wickets in match	–	0
Best bowling	–	3/50
Catches/stumpings	6/–	172/–
- Source: Cricinfo, 12 November 2008

Member of the House of Lords Lord Temporal
- In office 2 December 1928 – 6 June 1951; Hereditary Peerage
- Preceded by: Hallam Tennyson, 2nd Baron Tennyson
- Succeeded by: Harold Tennyson, 4th Baron Tennyson

Lionel Hallam Tennyson, 3rd Baron Tennyson (7 November 1889 – 6 June 1951) was known principally as a first-class cricketer who captained Hampshire and England. He was the grandson of the poet Alfred, Lord Tennyson.

== Early life and family ==
The son of Hallam Tennyson, the Governor of South Australia, Tennyson was born at Westminster in November 1889. His father would later be appointed Governor-General of Australia in 1903. He had lived in Australia since 1899, with his father and mother, Audrey, along with his siblings. He was initially educated in Australia at Melbourne Grammar School, where he first played cricket, before attending Eton College in England. There, he played for the college cricket team, initially as a fast bowler in 1907, before focussing on his batting in 1908. From there, he matriculated to Trinity College, Cambridge. He performed well in the freshmans match, but did not play for Cambridge University Cricket Club. He left Cambridge after one year, in order to join the British Army.

== Military service ==
Tennyson was commissioned into the Coldstream Guards as a second lieutenant in August 1909, before transferring to the Rifle Brigade in December 1912. His transfer allegedly came about from an agreement he reached with his father after losing £12,000 in the space of a week betting on horse racing, which had left him with £7,000 debt.

He served in the First World War with the Rifle Brigade, seeing action in September 1914 at the First Battle of the Marne. In October he was wounded in action, having been shot in the leg, causing him to fall into a trench and tear his ligaments. He was sent back home to recuperate, travelling home on board the SS Carisbrooke Castle, where he was informed by the wounded Lord Francis Scott that he had been pronounced dead by newspapers back home. He was promoted to lieutenant in December 1914, antedated to November 1914. Having recovered from his wound, Tennyson was seconded to headquarters as a staff captain to General Roy in March 1915, and returned to the Western Front in July 1915. Tennyson saw action in the allied defeat at the Battle of Loos in September–October 1915, with his promotion to captain occurring shortly after, but was not gazetted until March 1916.

Upon his promotion to captain, Tennyson undertook a machine gun course at Wisques and was shortly thereafter ordered to join the staff of General William Pulteney; however, his appointment to Pulteney was short-lived, as his brigade was ordered to the Ypres Salient and General Roy requested his return to his staff. He was made an acting major in July 1917, while commanding a battalion. Tennyson was wounded in action three times during the war, and was mentioned in despatches twice. He was decorated during the war with the Mons Star, and following the war with the Victory and General Service Medal's. His two younger brothers were killed in the war.

Tennyson resigned his commission in November 1919, one year after the conclusion of war, at which point he was granted the rank of major. He was later appointed Honorary Colonel of the 51st (London) Heavy Anti-Aircraft Regiment, Royal Artillery (a Territorial Army unit based in Chelsea, London) on 9 August 1931 and held the position until 1947.

== Cricket ==
=== Pre-war cricket and Test debut ===
Tennyson made his debut in first-class cricket for the Marylebone Cricket Club (MCC) against Oxford University at Lord's in 1913, making a century on debut when he scored 110 runs in the MCC second innings. In the same year, he also made his debut for Hampshire in the County Championship, with Tennyson playing nine times for Hampshire in 1913. He made three centuries in his debut season, in which he scored 832 runs at an average of 46.22. He scored heavily alongside Cecil Abercrombie, with the two going some way to compensate for the loss of C. B. Fry from the Hampshire team. Following his successful first season, the MCC offered him a place on the winter tour to South Africa as a replacement for Frederick Fane, which he accepted. Tennyson departed with the team on the Union-Castle Line steamer RMS Saxon from Southampton on 18 October 1913, with his parents amongst the crowd of well-wishers who saw the team off.

Tennyson played in the first five first-class matches of the tour against provincial and regional teams, before making his Test debut for England against South Africa at Durban on 13 December; he made 52 batting at number four in England's only innings. Tennyson played in all five Test matches on the tour, scoring 116 runs at an average of 16.57. He also played in eight further first-class matches on the tour against provincial and regional teams, though he failed to make a century in any of his first-class tour matches. For his performances in 1913, Tennyson was named one of Wisden's five Cricketers of the Year for 1914. Military duties and the outbreak of the First World War limited Tennyson to five first-class appearances in 1914, making three appearances for Hampshire in the County Championship while on leave. He played in the match between the MCC South African Touring Team against The Rest, which celebrated Lord's centenary. He also played for the British Army cricket team against the Royal Navy.

=== Hampshire and England captaincies ===
Tennyson played nine Test matches for England, five of them on the tour of South Africa under Johnny Douglas in 1913/14. In 1921, England having lost six Test matches in succession to the Australians under Warwick Armstrong, Tennyson was recalled to the team for the second Test at Lord's, and though the game was again lost, he scored an undefeated 74 in the second innings against Jack Gregory and Ted McDonald at their fastest. That innings led him to be appointed captain for the three remaining matches of the series, succeeding Douglas. The next game was lost; the final two matches were left drawn. At Headingley in the first of these three games as captain, Tennyson split his hand while fielding in the Australians' first innings but, patched up with what Wisden called a "basket guard", he made 63 and 36. He led several non-Test match tours overseas, to India, South Africa and the West Indies.

Tennyson was captain of Hampshire from 1919 to 1932. He was in charge of the team in the remarkable match against Warwickshire in 1922, when Hampshire were bowled out for 15 runs in their first innings and, having been forced to follow on, then scored 521 in the second innings and won the match by 155 runs.

In 1933 he published his autobiography, From Verse to Worse. Returning from his second war-wound to the Western Front he records: "I have never liked 'travelling light', and so, though the amount of kit I arrived with may, in fact, have aroused a certain amount of astonishment, I was quickly forgiven by my commanding officer as well as by everyone else, when they found out that it included, amongst other things, a case of champagne." He published a second volume of memoirs, Sticky Wickets, in 1950.

== Family and personal life ==
He succeeded his father, Hallam Tennyson, 2nd Baron Tennyson, to the title in 1928, having been known before that as Hon. Lionel Tennyson. (Note: His uncle, after whom he was named, was also called Hon. Lionel Tennyson.) He married Hon. Clare Tennant in 1918. They had three sons before they divorced in 1928:

- Harold Tennyson, 4th Baron Tennyson (1919–1991), died unmarried
- Mark Tennyson, 5th Baron Tennyson (1920–2006), married Deline Celeste Budler but died without issue
- Lionel Tennyson (1925–1925), died in infancy

He was later married to Carroll Donner (née Elting) from 1934 until their divorce in 1943.

== Works cited ==
- Allison, Lincoln (2012). Amateurism in Sport: An Analysis and Defence. Abingdon-on-Thames: Taylor & Francis. ISBN 9781136326714.
- Tufnell, Phil (2017). Tuffers' Cricket Hall of Fame. London: Headline Publishing Group. ISBN 9781472229380.
- Tennyson, Lionel (1933). From Verse to Worse. London: Cassell & Co.

Sporting positions
Preceded by Johnny Douglas	English national cricket captain 1921	Succeeded by Frank Mann
Preceded by Edward Sprot	Hampshire cricket captain 1919–1933	Succeeded by Geoffrey Lowndes
Peerage of the United Kingdom
Preceded by Hallam Tennyson	Baron Tennyson; 1928–1951	Succeeded by Harold Tennyson
