= James Garfield Beck =

American politician, educator (1881–1969)

James Garfield Beck (1881–1969) was an American educator, coach, postal clerk, socialite, and community leader in Knoxville, Tennessee. He graduated from Knoxville College.

Beck was born in Alabama and named for United States President James Garfield.

Beck became the first African American postal clerk in Tennessee. He and his wife Ethel B. Beck (1897 - 1970) helped establish the Ethel Beck Home for Colored Orphans in 1919. Beck was a sergeant at arms at the 1940 Republican National Convention. He died on February 9, 1969 at the age of 87.
