= Frederick Tennyson =

Frederick Tennyson (5 June 1807 in Louth, Lincolnshire – 26 February 1898 in Kensington) was an English poet.

== Life ==
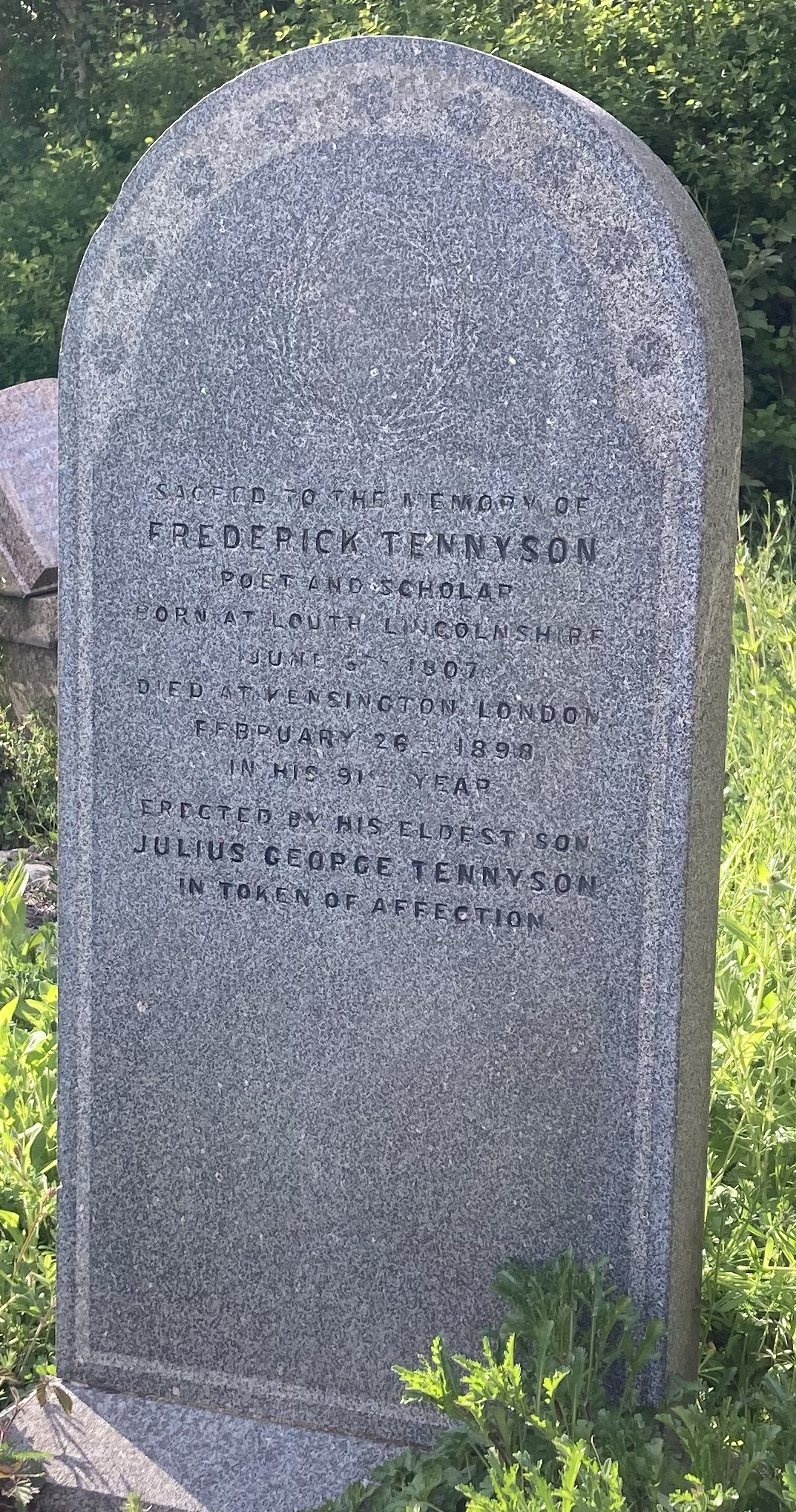
Grave of Frederick Tennyson in Highgate Cemetery

Frederick Tennyson was the eldest son of George Clayton Tennyson, Rector of Somersby, Lincolnshire, and brother of Alfred, Lord Tennyson. He was educated at Eton College (where, as a skilled cricketer, he was Captain of the Oppidans) and, from 1827, St John's College, Cambridge. While at Cambridge he contributed four poems to Poems, by Two Brothers, which Frederick, Alfred, Lord Tennyson, and their brother Charles Tennyson Turner published in 1827. He also won the Browne medal for Greek verse composition (a Sapphic ode on the pyramids) in 1828, but was rusticated for three terms for refusal to accept punishment for not attending chapel. Re-admitted to Cambridge in 1830, he graduated BA in 1832.

Tennyson passed most of his subsequent life in Italy and Jersey. On his inheritance of an estate near Grimsby in 1833, he went firstly to Corfu, then settled for twenty years in Florence, where he was a friend of Robert and Elizabeth Barrett Browning. In 1839 he married Maria Carolina Giuliotti, the daughter of the Chief magistrate of Tuscany.

He became an Anglo-Israelite and later joined the Church of the New Jerusalem.

He died on the 26th February 1898 and is buried on the west side of Highgate Cemetery.

== Works ==
- Days and Hours, 1854
- The Isles of Greece: Sappho and Alcæus, 1890
- Daphne and other poems, 1891
- Poems of the Day and Year, 1895
