= Charles Tennyson Turner =

English poet

- Born: Charles Tennyson; 4 July 1808; Somersby, Lincolnshire, England
- Died: 25 April 1879 (aged 70); Cheltenham, England
- Occupation: Poet
- Spouse: Louisa Sellwood (m. 1836)
- Relatives: Alfred Tennyson (brother); Emily Tennyson (sister-in-law)

Charles Tennyson Turner (born Charles Tennyson; 4 July 1808 – 25 April 1879) was an English poet. Born in Somersby, Lincolnshire, he was an elder brother of Alfred Tennyson; his friendship and the "heart union" with his brother is revealed in Poems by Two Brothers (1829). Another poet brother was Frederick Tennyson.

In 1833, Charles was ordained a priest in the Church of England. On 1 October 1835, he changed his surname to Turner after inheriting the estate of his great-uncle, the Reverend Samuel Turner of Caistor in Lincolnshire. On 24 May 1836, he married Louisa Sellwood, the younger sister of Alfred's future wife; she later suffered from mental illness and became an opium addict. Charles died on 25 April 1879, at the age of 70, at 6 Imperial Square in Cheltenham, Gloucestershire.

Turner was key in the construction of Grasby, a small village on the outskirts of Caistor. He helped construct part of the school (Grasby School) and was the vicar of Grasby Church for a while.

== Published works ==
- Sonnets (1864)
- Small Tableaux (1868)
- Sonnets, Lyrics and Translations (1873)
- Collected Poems (1880, 8 months after death), assembled by Alfred and Hallam Tennyson, and James Spedding
