= Julian Tennyson =

English writer and historian

Charles Julian Tennyson
- Born: 7 February 1915; Suffolk, England
- Died: 7 March 1945 (aged 30); Arakan, British Burma
- Cause of death: Killed in action (shrapnel)
- Spouse: Yvonne Cornu (m. 1937)
- Children: Simon Tennyson; Penelope Tennyson
- Writing career
- Notable works: Suffolk Scene; Rough Shooting

Charles Julian Tennyson (7 February 1915 – 7 March 1945) was an English writer and historian most famous for his writings on his home county of Suffolk.

He was the second son of Sir Charles Tennyson and his wife Lady Ivy Gladys (née Pretious), and the great-grandson of Alfred Tennyson, the Victorian poet laureate. Tennyson is most famous for his 1939 book Suffolk Scene, which documents the author's travels and experiences in Suffolk during the 1930s.

Tennyson enlisted in the British Army with the Irish Rifles at the outbreak of the Second World War. He was killed in action by flying shrapnel during the Battle of Arakan on 7 March 1945, while serving as a captain with the 6th Bn. Oxfordshire and Buckinghamshire Light Infantry. He is buried in Taukkyan War Cemetery in Burma. He is also commemorated by a headstone in St. Botolph's churchyard in Iken, Suffolk.

He was married to Yvonne Cornu, daughter of Colonel R. B. le Cornu, on 29 September 1937. They had twins Simon and Penelope, both born on 4 December 1939. His brother, the film director Pen Tennyson, also died during the Second World War, pre-deceasing him on 7 July 1941.
