= Farringford House =

Country house on the Isle of Wight, England

Coordinates: 50.674445°N 1.524915°W

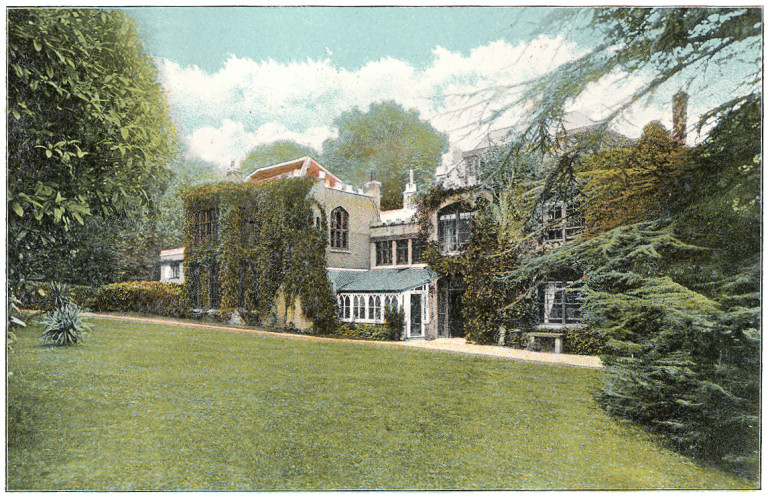
Farringford – Lord Tennyson's residence on the Isle of Wight

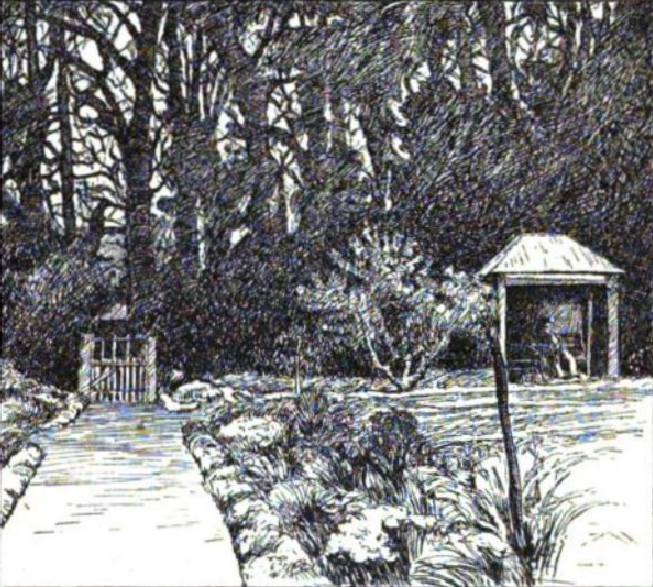
Sketch of poet Alfred Tennyson published one year after his death in 1892, seated in his favourite arbour at his Farringford House home in the village of Freshwater Bay, Isle of Wight

Farringford House, in the village of Freshwater Bay, Isle of Wight, was the home of the poet Alfred, Lord Tennyson, from 1853 until his death in 1892. The main house dates from 1806 with gothic embellishments and extensions added from the 1830s. Of particular historical importance is the second library built by his wife Emily Tennyson in 1871 with a play room below connected by a turreted winding staircase. The grounds are laid to lawn, rose borders and informal planting. Evidence remains of Tennyson's planting schemes, together with a section of the walled garden and wooden footpaths.

The house and grounds have undergone a programme of restoration having been a Pontin's hotel since they left the Tennyson family's ownership in the 1940s. New owners bought the hotel in 2007. They closed the hotel in 2009, and reopened it 2017 as a historic house/museum following renovation. Guided tours are available to book April to October. Group visits, writers' retreats, creative workshops, concerts and exhibitions are part of the offering. On the estate there are ten self-catering cottages which are available all year round, there is also a tennis court and children's play area.

Tennyson wrote of Farringford:

"Where, far from noise and smoke of town
I watch the twilight falling brown,
All round a careless-ordered garden,
Close to the ridge of a noble down".

Tennyson rented Farringford in 1853, and then bought it in 1856. He found that there were too many starstruck tourists who pestered him in Farringford, so he moved to "Aldworth", a stately home on a hill known as Blackdown in Lurgashall, about 2 km south of Haslemere in West Sussex in 1869. However, he returned to Farringford to spend the winters.

== Estate ==
The estate is located on Bedbury Lane, Freshwater Bay, on the south shore of the Isle of Wight, near its western point. Some of the surrounding houses, particularly those in Middleton at the start of Moons Hill are connected with Farringford's history, once forming part of the estate. The houses at the end of Queens Road, the junction near the farm used to be stables where Fred Pontin's horses were kept.

Red squirrels can at times be seen on the estate.

== Access ==
Southern Vectis' Needles Breezer open top bus has a stop outside Farringford and this is the only bus that goes down Bedbury Lane towards Alum Bay.

== See also ==
- Tennyson Down, a location near Farringford House
