= Jonathan Tennyson (physicist) =

British physicist (born 1955)

Jonathan Tennyson FRS
- Born: Charles Jonathan Penrose Tennyson; 11 May 1955 (age 71); Hitchin, Hertfordshire, England
- Education: University of Cambridge; University of Sussex
- Occupation: Physicist
- Scientific career
- Workplaces: University College London
- Thesis: Studies in the ab initio calculation of molecular energies. (1980)
- Website: www.ucl.ac.uk/physics-astronomy/amopp/people/jonathan_tennyson/

Charles Jonathan Penrose Tennyson FRS (born 11 May 1955) is a British physicist. He is the Massey Professor of Physics (since 2005) and Head of department at the Department of Physics and Astronomy, University College London (2004–11). Chief Scientist Quantemol Ltd and chair, Blue Skies Space Ltd.

== Education ==
He was educated at Bootham School, York. He continued his studies at King's College, Cambridge and the University of Sussex.

== Research and career ==
Tennyson is an author of over 700 scientific papers focusing on applications of molecular spectroscopy to problems in astrophysics, atmospheric science, plasma physics and other fields. He has written a number of popular science articles. He wrote the undergraduate textbook Astronomical Spectroscopy: An Introduction to the Atomic and Molecular Physics of Astronomical Spectra (2005). Leader of the ExoMol project.

== Awards and honours ==
He received the 2007 Ellis R. Lippincott Award from The Optical Society. He was elected a Fellow of the Royal Society (FRS) in 2009.

Tennyson was awarded the 2025 Royal Astronomical Society's gold medal for his pioneering work advancing our understanding of exoplanets.

== Personal life ==
He is the son of Hallam Tennyson, grandson of Sir Charles Tennyson and is the great-great-grandson of Alfred Lord Tennyson. He is the father of actor Matthew Tennyson.
