= Charles Tennyson (civil servant) =

Sir Charles Bruce Locker Tennyson CMG (8 November 1879 – 22 June 1977), a grandson of the poet Alfred, Lord Tennyson, was a civil servant, an industrialist, and an academic of his grandfather.

Tennyson was the son of the Hon. Lionel Tennyson and his wife Eleanor Bertha Mary, eldest daughter of Frederick Locker-Lampson. His father was the younger son of Alfred, Lord Tennyson. He was educated at Eton College and King's College, Cambridge, where he gained a first in Part I of the Law Tripos and was a Whewell Scholar in 1903.

In 1909, Tennyson married Ivy Gladys OBE (née Pretious). They had three sons, two of whom were killed during the Second World War:

- Frederick Penrose Tennyson, known as Pen (26 August 1912 – 7 July 1941)
- Charles Julian Tennyson (7 February 1915 – 7 March 1945)
- Beryl Hallam Augustine Tennyson (10 December 1920 – 21 December 2005), radio producer and father of:
  - Charles Jonathan Penrose Tennyson (born 11 May 1955), a physicist
  - Sita Rosalind Joanna Tennyson (born 28 April 1950), social innovator and consultant

Tennyson was made a Companion of the Order of St Michael and St George (CMG) in the 1915 New Year Honours and was knighted in the 1945 Birthday Honours.
