= Glenconner =

Glenconner may refer to:

- Baron Glenconner, a peerage created in 1911, also known as the Tennant Baronetcy
- Edward Tennant, 1st Baron Glenconner (1859-1920)
- Colin Tennant, 3rd Baron Glenconner (1926-2010)
- Anne Tennant, Baroness Glenconner (born 1932)
