= Charles Tennant =

Scottish chemist and industrialist (1768–1838)

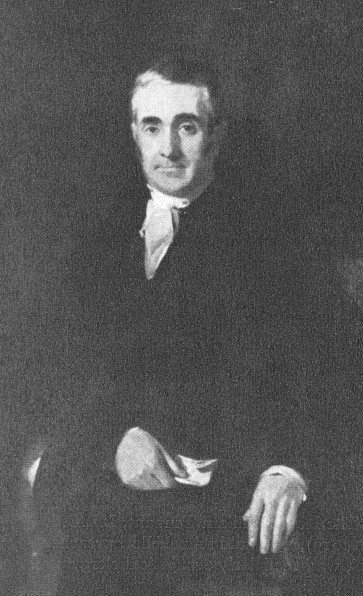
- Born: 3 May 1768; Laigh Corton, Alloway, Scotland
- Died: 1 October 1838 (aged 70); Abercromby Place, Glasgow, Scotland
- Occupations: Businessperson, chemist, industrialist
- Parent(s): John Tennant; Margaret McClure
- Family: Tennant

Charles Tennant (3 May 1768 – 1 October 1838) was a Scottish chemist and industrialist. He discovered bleaching powder and founded an industrial dynasty.

== Biography ==
Charles Tennant was born at Laigh Corton, Alloway, Ayrshire, the sixth of thirteen surviving children of farmer John "Auld Glen" Tennant (1725–1810), later of Glenconner, Ochiltree, Ayrshire, and his second wife, Margaret McClure (1738–1784). He was educated at home and at the Ochiltree parish school, then was apprenticed by his father to a master handloom weaver at Kilbarchan in Renfrewshire. The Tennant family were friends with the poet Robert Burns (1759–1796); in his epistle to "James Tennant of Glenconner" Tennant is mentioned as "wabster (Scots language: weaver) Charlie", in reference to the occupation Tennant had undertaken.

== Impetus ==
Tennant was quick to learn his trade, but also to see that the growth of the weaving industry was restricted by the primitive methods used to bleach the cloth. At that time this involved treatment with stale urine and leaving the cloth exposed to sunlight for many months in so called bleachfield. Huge quantities of unbleached cotton piled up in the warehouses. Tennant left his well paid weaving position to try to develop improved bleaching methods.

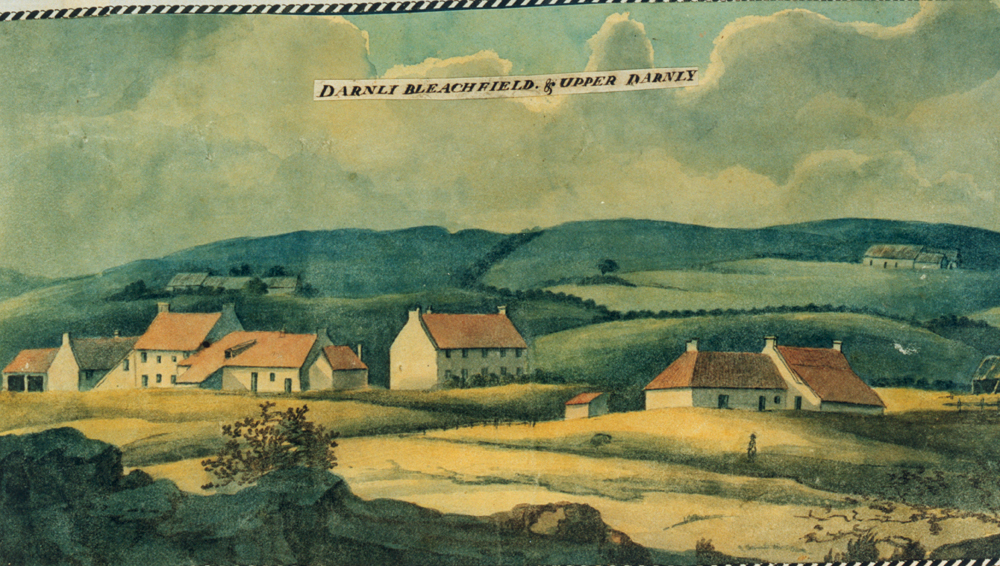
Charles Tennant's Darnley Bleach Fields c. 1800

He acquired bleaching fields in 1788, at Darnley, in Glasgow, and turned his mind and energy to developing ways to shorten the time required in bleaching. Others had already managed to reduce bleaching time from eighteen months to four by replacing sour milk with sulfuric acid. Further, in the last half of the eighteenth century, bleachers started to use lime in the bleaching process, but only in secret due to possible injurious effects. Tennant had the original idea that a combination of chlorine and lime would produce the best bleaching results. He worked on this idea for several years and was finally successful. His method proved to be effective, inexpensive and harmless. He was granted patent #2209 on 23 January 1798. He continued his research and developed a bleaching powder for which he was granted patent #2312 on 30 April 1799.

== St Rollox Chemical Works ==
While still working in the bleachfields around 1794, Tennant formed a partnership with four friends. The first of these, Dr. William Couper, was the legal advisor to the partnership. The second partner was Alexander Dunlop (His brother married Charles' eldest daughter), who served as accountant to the group. The third partner, James Knox, managed the sales department. Charles Macintosh, an excellent chemist, was the fourth partner. He is known for his technique of macintosh waterproofing and he also assisted in the invention of bleaching powder.

Immediately after granting of the patent on bleaching, Charles and his partners purchased land on the Monkland Canal, just north of Glasgow, to build a factory for the production of bleaching liquor and powder. The area was known as St. Rollox, after a French holy man. It was close to a good supply of lime, and since the area was rural, the land was cheap. The nearby canal provided excellent transport. Production was swiftly moved from the earlier bleachfields in Darnley, to the new plant in St. Rollox. It quickly became successful. Production increased from fifty-two tons the first year, 1799, to over 9200 tons in the fifth year. Later a second plant was built at Hebburn, raising production of bleaching powder alone to 20,000 tons by 1865.

In 1798, James Knox and Robert Tennant (Charles's younger brother), went to Ireland where they struck a deal with the Irish bleachers, for the use of the process. Although the Irish bleachers admitted a saving of over £160,000 in 1799 alone, by using the Tennant process, they never paid for its use as agreed. As a result, the partnership lost a great deal in time and money. Further losses came from challenges to the patents in England and Ireland and the outright infringement of the process. In spite of these worrisome problems the partnership was a great success. It continued for fourteen years when the rights under the patents expired.

Charles continued to expand his horizons during this time. When the partnership ended, he purchased the company. During the 1830s and 1840s, his company was the largest chemical plant in the world.

== Reformer ==
As a dedicated reformer Charles eventually played a large part in the political movements of the day. A great deal of unrest followed the Napoleonic Wars, which had the effect of increased wealth for the manufacturing classes but poverty for the working classes. He worked for many years in the reform movement, but it was not until he reached the age of 64 that his efforts had meaningful results, in the form of the Reform Bill of 1832. Following the success of this Bill, Charles appears to have been a leading light in the movement to honor Scotland's Political Martyr Thomas Muir of Huntershill. His ideas and active support helped create one of the most productive periods of social progress and reform in Scotland's history.

By 1832, St. Rollox was consuming thirty thousand tons of coal a year. However, the transport system had not been designed to handle this volume. To solve these issues, he designed new ways to transport people and freight, using wagons pulled by a steam engine, on iron rails laid on a level roadbed. He conceived these ideas based on information provided by his good friend George Stephenson, a talented railway engineer. From 1825, he was one of the prime influencers of Scottish railway expansion. He was a key influence responsible for getting a railway into Glasgow, over the fierce opposition of the canal proprietors.

In an attempt to control the transportation of chemical products to nearby markets, he provided his younger sister Sarah's son, William Sloan, with several small schooners in 1830. At the time of Sloan's death in 1848, they had the largest fleet in Glasgow, and were running nineteen vessels.

Charles lived to see his empire grow to be the largest and most important in the world. On his death on 1 October 1838, his eldest son John Tennant became managing director of Charles Tennant & Co for the next 40 years. Among other diverse business interests, he also became a partner in the Bonnington Chemical Works.

== Discovery ==
With the chemist Charles Macintosh (1766–1843) he helped establish Scotland's first alum works at Hurlet, Renfrewshire. In 1798 he took out a patent for a bleach liquor formed by passing chlorine into a mixture of lime and water. This product had the advantage of being cheaper than the one generally used at the time because it substituted lime for potash. Unfortunately when Tennant attempted to protect his rights against infringement, his patent was held invalid on the double ground that the specification was incomplete and that the invention had been anticipated at a bleach works near Nottingham. Tennant's great discovery was bleaching powder (chloride of lime) for which he took a patent in 1799. The process involved reacting chlorine and dry slaked lime to form bleaching powder, a mixture of calcium hypochlorite and other derivatives. It seems Macintosh also played a significant role in this discovery and remained one of Tennant's associates for many years.

== Fortune ==
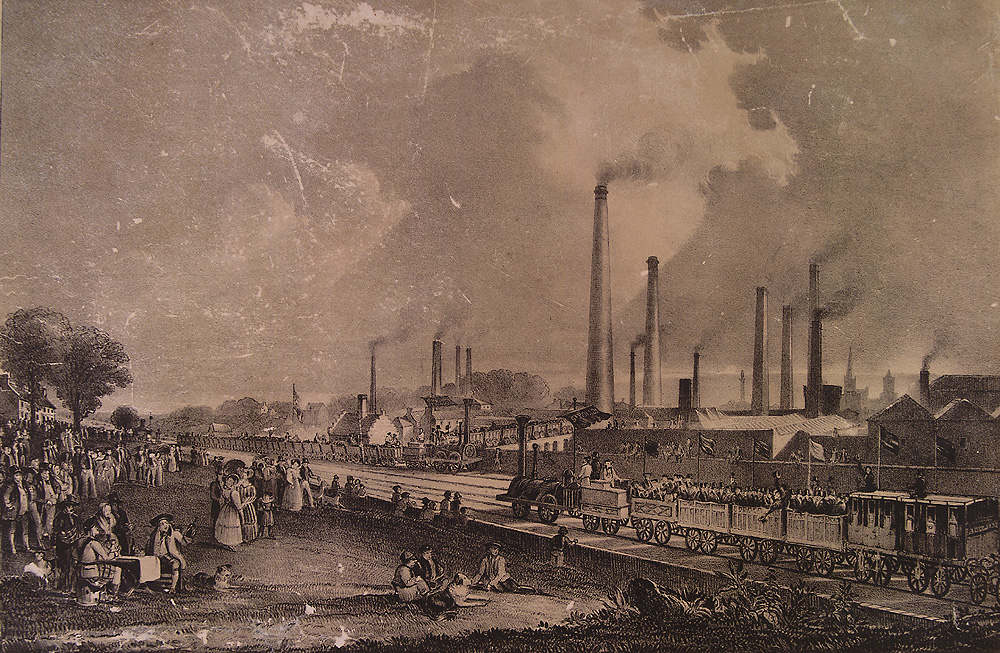
Charles Tennant's St. Rollox Chemical Works in 1831

In 1800, Tennant founded a chemical works at St. Rollox, Glasgow. The principal product being bleaching powder (calcium hypochlorite), which was sold worldwide. By 1815 the business was known as Charles Tennant & Co. and had expanded into other chemicals, metallurgy and explosives. The early rail network in Scotland and important mines in Spain were also areas of interest.

The St. Rollox plant grew to be the largest chemical works in the world during the 1830s and 1840s. It covered over 100 acres (0.4 km^{2}) and had 250,000 square feet (23,000 m^{2}) of floor space. It had a payroll of over one thousand persons and dominated the local economy. The huge chimney known as the St. Rollox Stalk aka Tennant's Stalk towered over everything. It was a well-known landmark around Glasgow. Built in 1842, it rose 435.5 feet (132.7 m) in the air. It was 40 feet (12.2 m) in diameter at ground level. At the time of construction it was the tallest such structure in the world (losing the accolade 17 years later to the Townsend Chimney, less than a mile away at Port Dundas). In 1922, it was struck by lightning and had to be dynamited down – four workmen died when part of the structure collapsed during the process – but until that time it was in daily use.

== Legacy ==
Tennant died at his home at Abercromby Place in Glasgow on 1 October 1838, aged 70. He is buried in Glasgow Necropolis where his monument stands on the upper plateau. The unusual statue thereon is in the form of a very casually (arguably slumped) seated figure. The sculpture is by Patric Park (1811–1855) and appears to be based on Francis Chantrey's statue of James Watt in the nearby Hunterian Museum.

The business empire Tennant founded and the immense wealth generated soon expanded even further with major initiatives in explosives with Alfred Nobel, copper, sulphur, gold mines and banking His grandson Charles Clow Tennant (1823–1906) became the 1st baronet of Glenconner. The chemical business founded by Tennant became known as the United Alkali Company Ltd. and eventually merged with others in 1926 to form the chemical giant Imperial Chemical Industries. The chemical works at Springburn closed in 1964. Outwith ICI and its successors the privately owned group, now Tennants Consolidated Ltd., continues with headquarters in London and chemicals, colours and distribution trade with every continent.

== Notable descendants and relatives ==
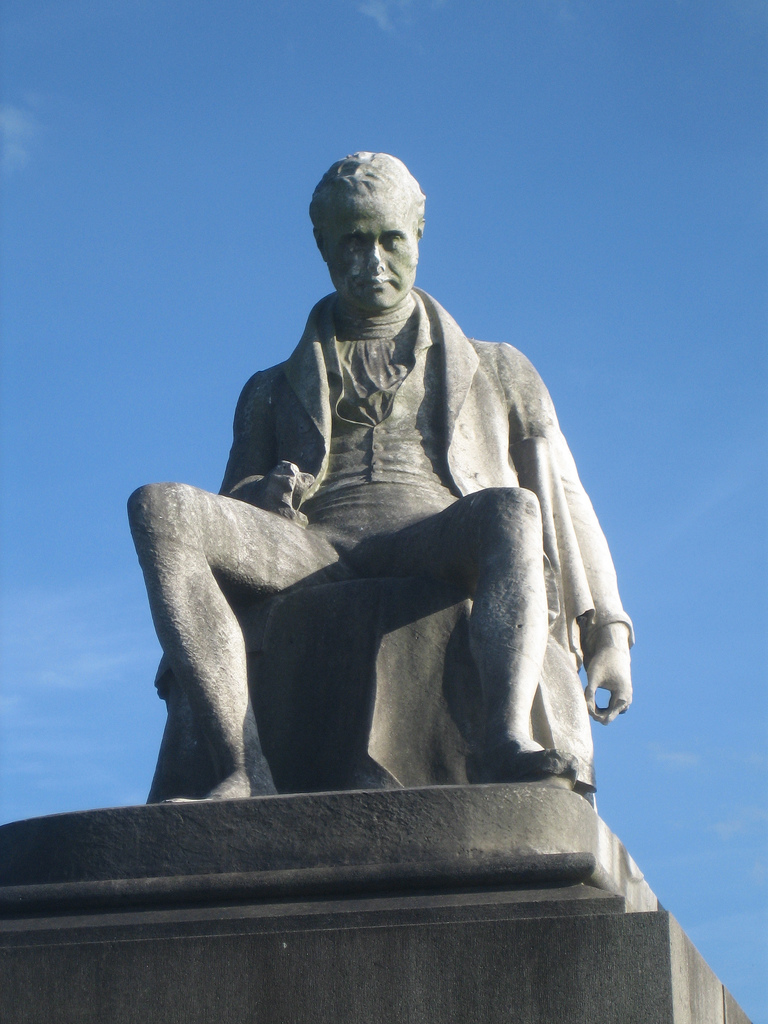
Statue (1838), Glasgow Necropolis

- Alexander Tennant (1772–1814) brother
- Charles Clow Tennant (1823–1906) grandson
- Edward Tennant, 1st Baron Glenconner (1859–1920) great-grandson
- Margot Asquith (1864–1946) great-granddaughter
- Harold Tennant (1865–1935) great-grandson
- Edward Tennant (1897–1916) 2nd great-grandson
- Elizabeth Bibesco (1897–1945) 2nd great-granddaughter
- Anthony Asquith (1902–1968) 2nd great-grandson
- Stephen Tennant (1906–1987) 2nd great-grandson
- Simon Fraser, 15th Lord Lovat (1911–1995) 3rd great-grandson
- Hugh Fraser (British politician) (1918–1984) 3rd great-grandson
- Harold Tennyson, 4th Baron Tennyson (1919–1991) 3rd great-grandson
- Charles Manners, 10th Duke of Rutland (1919–1999) 3rd great-grandson
- Iain Tennant (1919–2006) 3rd great-grandson
- David Fane, 15th Earl of Westmorland (1924–1993) 3rd great-grandson
- Emma Tennant (b. 1937) 3rd great-granddaughter
- Arthur Gore, 9th Earl of Arran (b. 1938) 4th great-grandson
- Torquhil Campbell, 13th Duke of Argyll (b. 1968) 5th great-grandson
- Stella Tennant (1970-2020) 4th great-granddaughter
- Honor Fraser (b. 1974) 5th great-granddaughter

== Sources ==
- Poems and Songs of Robert Burns publisher: London, Collins, 1955 ISBN 1-4264-0558-8 OCLC 53420849.
- Blow, Simon (1987), Broken Blood – The Rise and Fall of the Tennant family. London: Faber. ISBN 0-571-13374-6 OCLC 16470862.
- Dugdale, Nancy (1973). Tennant's Stalk: the story of the Tennants of the Glen. London: Macmillan. ISBN 0-333-13820-1. OCLC 2736092.
- The will of Charles Tennant (1768–1838) 1840 Glasgow Sheriff Court Wills ref: SC36/51/16.
- The will of Margaret Wilson (1766–1843) 1845 Glasgow Sheriff Court Wills ref: SC36/51/21.
- Ordnance Survey map of Ayrshire 1860.
- Ordnance Survey map of Renfrewshire 1863.
- An Avant-Garde Family: A History of the Tennants.
