= Pamela Wyndham =

British writer and aristocrat (1871–1928)

The Right Honourable The Viscountess Grey of Fallodon
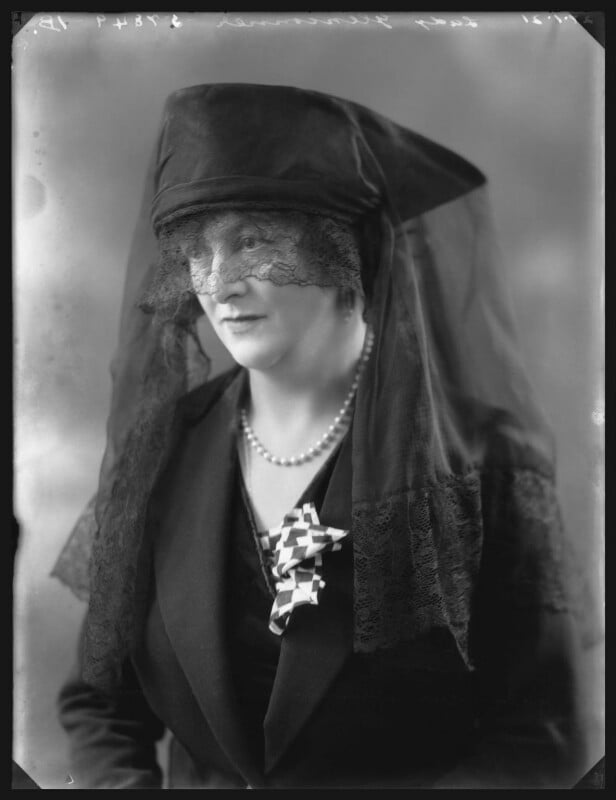
- The widowed Tennant in 1921

Personal details
- Born: Pamela Adelaide Genevieve Wyndham; 14 January 1871 Clouds House, East Knoyle, Wiltshire, England
- Died: 18 November 1928 (aged 57) Wilsford Manor, Wilsford cum Lake, Wiltshire, England
- Spouses: Edward Tennant, 1st Baron Glenconner (m. 1895; died 1920) Edward Grey, 1st Viscount Grey of Fallodon (m. 1922)
- Children: Clare Tennant; Edward Tennant; Christopher Tennant, 2nd Baron Glenconner; David Tennant; Stephen Tennant
- Parent: Percy Wyndham (father)

Pamela Adelaide Genevieve Grey, Viscountess Grey of Fallodon (born Wyndham; previously Pamela Tennant, Baroness Glenconner; 14 January 1871 – 18 November 1928), was an English writer. The wife of Edward Tennant, 1st Baron Glenconner, and later of Edward Grey, 1st Viscount Grey of Fallodon, she is one of the Wyndham Sisters painted by John Singer Sargent, who were at the centre of the cultural and political life of their time. Like their parents, they were part of The Souls.

== Early life ==
Wyndham was born on 14 January 1871 at Clouds House in Salisbury, Wiltshire, England. She was the daughter of Hon. Percy Wyndham (1835–1911) and Madeline Caroline Frances Eden Campbell. Her mother was the daughter of Sir Guy Campbell, 1st Baronet, and his wife Pamela FitzGerald, daughter of Lord Edward FitzGerald and Pamela Syms. Her father was the son of George Wyndham, 1st Baron Leconfield, and his wife Mary Fanny Blunt, the daughter of Rev. William Blunt.

The 1899 portrait of Pamela and her sisters (Mary, wife of the 11th Earl of Wemyss, and Madeline, wife of Charles Adeane, the Lord Lieutenant of Cambridgeshire) by John Singer Sargent, known as "The Wyndham Sisters", was once described as "the greatest picture of modern times" by The Times.

== Career ==
In 1919, Wyndham published the successful memoirs of her son Edward Tennant, who had been killed during World War I. She also published poems, prose, children's literature, and edited poetry and prose anthologies.

She was friends, among others, with Henry James, Oscar Wilde and Edward Burne-Jones, and was part of the poetic and literary circle known as The Souls. In 1912, she hosted three lectures by Ezra Pound in her private art gallery. One her greatest friends was Edith Olivier; Olivier was a year younger than Wyndham, and they were childhood friends.

In April 1927, as Viscountess Grey, she became the first President of the newly formed North East Coast branch of the Electrical Association for Women in Newcastle-on-Tyne.

== Personal life ==
In 1895, Pamela Wyndham married Edward Tennant (1859–1920), who was educated at Eton and at Trinity College, Cambridge. Edward was the eldest surviving son of eleven children born to Sir Charles Tennant, 1st Baronet, and succeeded to his father's baronetcy upon the later's death in 1906. From 1908 until his death in 1920, he served as Lord Lieutenant of Peeblesshire. His sister, Margot Tennant, was married to H. H. Asquith, Prime Minister from 1894 until 1928. In 1911, Edward Tennant was raised to the peerage as Baron Glenconner, of The Glen in the County of Peebles, which gave Pamela Tennant the title of Baroness Glenconner.

Pamela and Edward Tennant were the parents of:

- Hon. Clarissa "Clare" Madeline Georgiana Felicite Tennant (1896–1960), married 1) Adrian Bethell, 2) Hon. Lionel Tennyson (later 3rd Baron Tennyson) 3) James M. Beck Jr.
- Lieutenant Hon. Edward Tennant (1897–1916), war poet who was killed at the Battle of the Somme
- Christopher Grey Tennant, 2nd Baron Glenconner (1899–1983), married Pamela Paget, the daughter of Sir Richard Paget, 2nd Baronet
- Hon. David Pax Tennant (1902–1968), socialite who founded the Gargoyle Club in London
- Stephen James Napier Tennant (1906–1987), socialite known for his decadent lifestyle who was called "the brightest" of the "Bright Young Things"

Following her first husband's death in 1920, in 1922, she married the widower Edward Grey, 1st Viscount Grey of Fallodon (1862–1933), a Liberal statesman who served as Member of Parliament, Secretary of State for Foreign Affairs (under Asquith), and British Ambassador to the United States.

Viscountess Grey died on 18 November 1928, age 57, at Wilsford Manor in Wilsford cum Lake, near Salisbury. The house had been built between 1904–1906 during her first marriage.

Her second husband died on 7 September 1933 and the viscountcy became extinct on his death, though he was succeeded in the baronetcy by his cousin, Sir George Grey.

== In popular culture ==
The 2014 book Those Wild Wyndhams: Three Sisters at the Heart of Power by Claudia Renton is about the lives of the Wyndham sisters, Mary, Madeline, and Pamela.

== Works ==
- Windlestraw: A book of verse, 1905
- The Children and The Pictures, 1907 published by Heinemann
- The White Wallet, 1912, republished in 1928 with illustrations by Stephen Tennant
- The Story of Joan Arc, 1915
- The Saving of the Children, 1918
- Edward Wyndham Tennant: a memoir by his mother Pamela Glenconner, 1919
- Shepherd's Crowns: a volume of essays, 1923
