= Christopher Tennant, 2nd Baron Glenconner =

British aristocrat (1899–1983)

The Right Honourable The Lord Glenconner
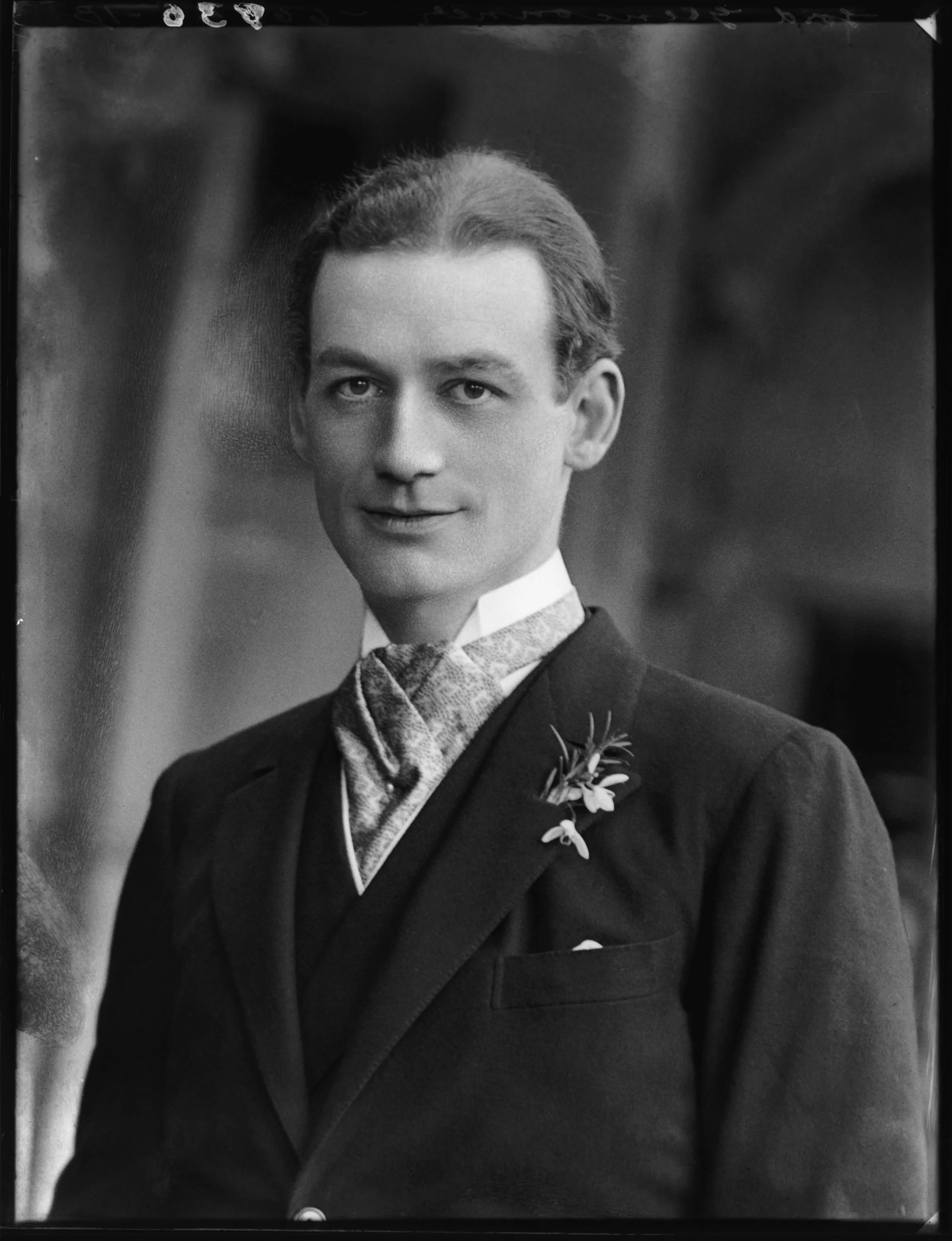
- Tennant in 1926

Member of the House of Lords
- Lord Temporal
- In office 21 November 1920 – 4 October 1983
- Preceded by: The 1st Baron Glenconner
- Succeeded by: The 3rd Baron Glenconner

Personal details
- Born: Christopher Grey Tennant; 14 June 1899 Warminster, Wiltshire, England
- Died: 4 October 1983 (aged 84) Corfu, Greece
- Spouse(s): Pamela Paget (m. 1925; div. 1935) Elizabeth Powell (m. 1935)
- Parent(s): Edward Tennant, 1st Baron Glenconner; Pamela Wyndham

Christopher Grey Tennant, 2nd Baron Glenconner (14 June 1899 – 4 October 1983), of The Glen, Scottish Borders, was a British peer, businessman and Royal Navy officer.

He was the second son of Edward Tennant, 1st Baron Glenconner, a Liberal politician and businessman, and Pamela Wyndham, a daughter of Hon. Percy Wyndham and one of The Wyndham Sisters who later remarried the 1st Viscount Grey of Fallodon. He was educated at Eton, after which in 1912 he was commissioned as a sub-lieutenant in the Royal Navy. He served on HMS Lord Nelson, HMS Castor, and HMS Royal Oak during World War I.

Upon his father's death in 1920, and as a result of the premature death of his elder brother in World War I, he succeeded as Baron Glenconner and Baronet Tennant, of The Glen and St Rollox.

Like his grandfather, Sir Charles Tennant, Glenconner was a well-known patron of the arts. Aside from being chairman of various family related businesses, such as C. Tennant, Sons & Company, he served as chairman of Northern Assurance Co. Ltd. and was a director of Hambros Bank.

During World War II, Glenconner was head of SOE, Cairo.

Glenconner was married twice. Firstly, in 1925, to Pamela Winifred Paget (1903–1989), daughter of Sir Richard Paget, 2nd Baronet; secondly, in 1935, to Elizabeth Powell, daughter of Lt.-Col. Evelyn Powell. In total he had five children. He was the father of Colin Tennant, 3rd Baron Glenconner (1926–2010), who was noted for having owned and developed the Caribbean island Mustique. From his second marriage, he was the father of the novelist Hon. Emma Tennant (1937–2017).

Baronetage of the United Kingdom
Preceded by Edward Tennant	Baronet of The Glen and St Rollox; 1920–1983	Succeeded by Colin Tennant
Peerage of the United Kingdom
Preceded by Edward Tennant	Baron Glenconner; 1920–1983	Succeeded by Colin Tennant
