= David Tennant (aristocrat) =

British aristocrat and socialite (1902–1968)

The Honourable David Tennant
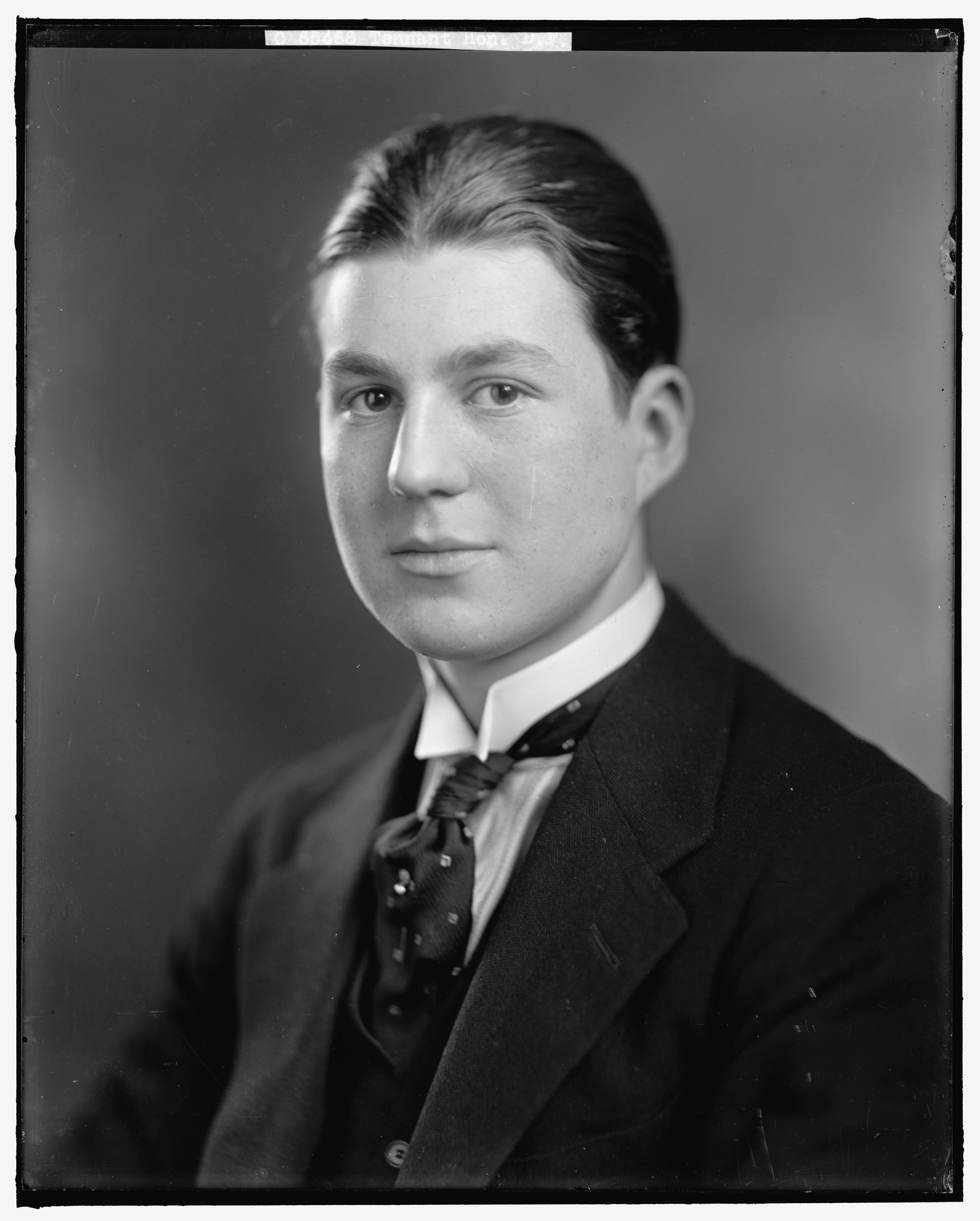
- Harris & Ewing, before 1945
- Born: David Pax Tennant; 22 May 1902
- Died: 8 April 1968 (aged 65); Spain
- Known for: One of the "Bright Young Things"
- Spouses: Hermione Baddeley (m. 1928; div. 1937) Virginia Parsons (m. 1938; div. 1953): Shelagh Rainey
- Children: 4, including Pauline Tennant
- Parents: Edward Tennant, 1st Baron Glenconner (father); Pamela Wyndham (mother)
- Relatives: Margot Asquith, Countess of Oxford and Asquith (paternal aunt); Edward Grey, 1st Viscount Grey of Fallodon (stepfather); Edward Tennant (brother); Stephen Tennant (brother); Emma Tennant (niece); Stella Tennant (great-niece)

David Pax Tennant (22 May 1902 – 8 April 1968) was a British aristocrat socialite, and the founder of the Gargoyle Club in London's Soho.

== Early life ==
Tennant was the third son of Edward Tennant, who became Lord Glenconner in 1911, and the writer Pamela Wyndham, later wife of Edward Grey, 1st Viscount Grey of Fallodon.

He was the younger brother of the war poet Edward Tennant and the older brother of socialite Stephen Tennant. Margot Asquith, author and second wife of the prime minister H. H. Asquith, was his paternal aunt.

== Career ==
Tennant founded the Gargoyle as a private members' club on the upper floors of 69 Dean Street, Soho, London in 1925. He created an arena where Bohemians could mingle comfortably with the upper crust, according to the writer Michael Luke. There were lavish interiors, paintings by Henri Matisse, and regular patrons included Virginia Woolf, Duncan Grant, Nancy Cunard, Fred Astaire and later Francis Bacon and Lucian Freud. In 1952, Tennant sold the Gargoyle as a going concern for £5,000 to caterer John Negus and it remained popular for several years.

He was one of the original members of the Bright Young Things in London in the 1920s. One of the parties he organized for the group was in the Burlington Galleries and had a Mozart theme and required the guests to dress in eighteenth-century costume. Another was his “pajamas-and-bottle-party” where the guests came in nightwear and brought their own alcohol.

Tennant worked at the British Broadcasting Corporation from 1924 to 1929 as an announcer, in 1943 he re-joined the BBC as a home announcer.

From 1939 Tennant served as an officer in the Royal Artillery until he was invalided out in 1941.

== Personal life ==
In 1928, Tennant married the actress Hermione Baddeley. They rented Teffont Evias Manor, which became known for their boisterous parties (including mixed naked bathing in the goldfish pond). They had two children, a son, David, and a daughter, Pauline (1927–2008). Pauline was an actress and a poet. She married three times. Her partners were: the anthropologist Julian Pitt-Rivers; Euan Douglas Graham, grandson of the 5th Duke of Montrose; and Sir Anthony Rumbold, 10th Baronet. Tennant and Baddeley divorced in 1937, but remained good friends.

In 1938, Tennant married Virginia Penelope Parsons, the daughter of Alan Parsons and Viola Tree (daughter of the actor-manager Sir Herbert Beerbohm Tree). They had two daughters, Georgia (born 1941) and Sabrina (born 1943). They divorced in 1953 and, afterward, Virginia married Henry Thynne, 6th Marquess of Bath, thus becoming the Marchioness of Bath.

He later married Shelagh Rainey, sister of the fashion designer Michael Rainey and daughter of Sean Rainey and Joyce Marion Wallace (1923–2006), better known as Marion Wrottesley after her marriage to Richard Wrottesley (later 5th Baron Wrottesley). Shelagh Tennant died in Spain in 2018, aged 75.

Tennant died in Spain on 8 April 1968 aged 65.
