= C. Tennant, Sons & Company =

British merchant bank

C. Tennant, Sons & Company was a British merchant bank that was prominent in metals and minerals markets, and also played a key role in development of the Gulf States in their early years of independence. The firm's antecedents go back to the early 19th century. In the early 1960s it had its main offices at Harp Lane in the City of London as well as offices in New York, San Francisco, São Paulo, Lima, La Paz and Bermuda.

The firm traded in metals/minerals, chemicals, fabricated metals and machinery & equipment. The firm was a founder member of the London Metal Exchange in 1877.

== Evolution ==
The bank had strong patrician antecedents being primarily controlled by the family of Baron Glenconner, i.e. the Tennant family. The firm had its origins in chemical manufacturing when in 1811, Charles Tennant and Co of St Rollox, Glasgow established an associated company, C. Tennant Sons and Co Ltd, as "Bleaching powder manufacturers". The firm's driving force as it evolved into a merchant bank was Sir Charles Tennant, 1st Baronet (1823-1906). He had joined the St Rollox chemical works in 1843 and was the son of John Tennant and grandson of the founder of the firm, Charles Tennant.

The partnership took limited company status in 1907. Sir Edward P. Tennant continued as chairman. The company continued to manage the sugar, cocoa and rubber estates, and the merchant business in Trinidad which had formerly belonged to the late Sir Charles Tennant. In 1930, C. Tennant Sons and Co was one of the Tennant companies consolidated under the name of the Tennant Group of companies.

Charles Denman, 5th Baron Denman was a director of the company and secured for the company the sole agency for Qatar, and was involved in every aspect of the Gulf state's early modernisation.

== Acquisition ==
In 1963, the large mining conglomerate Consolidated Gold Fields acquired 90% of the shares in the merchant bank, primarily for its strong position in tin trading, as ConsGold was a major owner of tin mines in Australia (through Renison Goldfields Consolidated), South Africa and England and Tennants brought along trading relationships with the major South American tin producers.

== On-going Existence ==
The company has been known as Tennant Metals since 1966. In 1982, ConsGold sold the trader to Renison Goldfields Consolidated and it became its in-house reagent supplier and production marketer. In 2011, the company became part of Metalcorp Group B.V, an international and diversified metals and minerals group, present in more than 20 countries across the world. Tennant Metals is responsible for the trading of all non-ferrous metals within the group.
