= Baron Glenconner =

Title in the Peerage of the United Kingdom

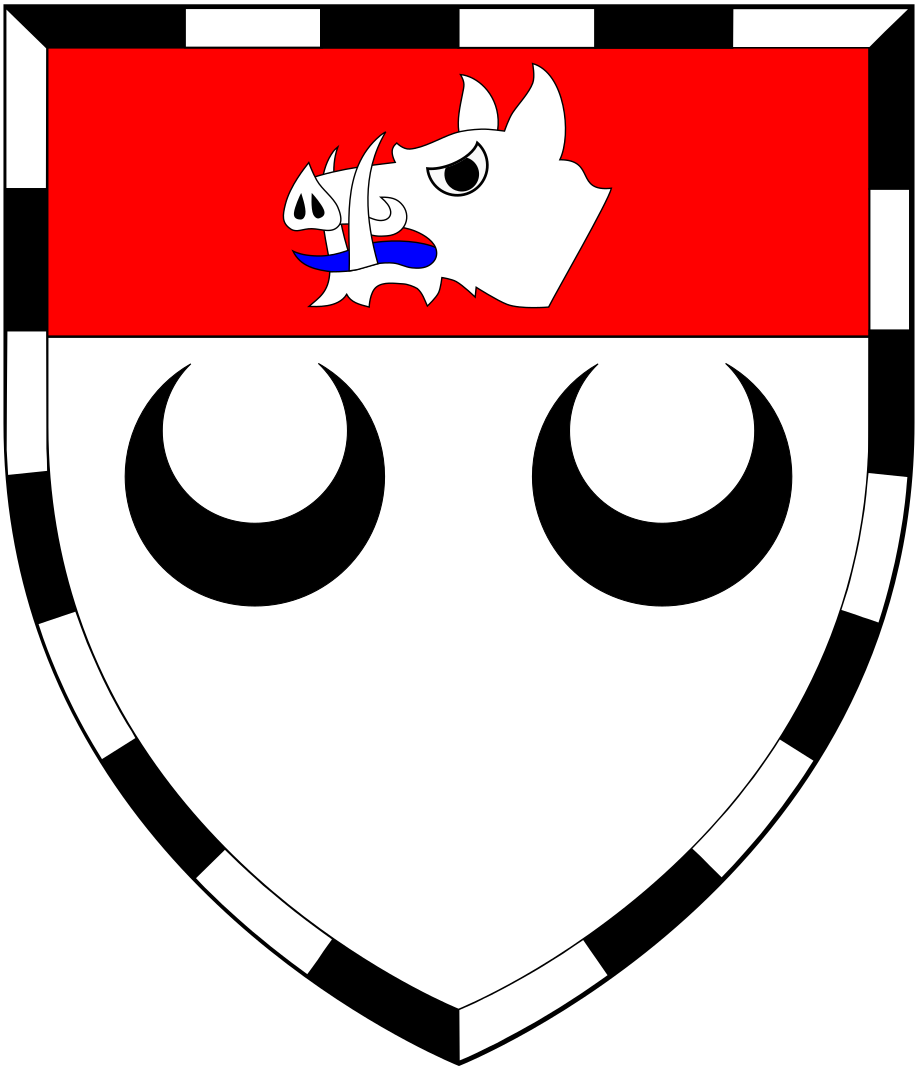
- Arms of Tennant: Argent, two crescents in fess sable on a chief gules a boar's head couped of the first[1]
- Creation date: 1911
- Creation: First
- Created by: King George V
- Peerage: Peerage of the United Kingdom
- First holder: Edward Priaulx Tennant, 1st Baron Glenconner
- Present holder: Cody Charles Edward Tennant, 4th Baron Glenconner
- Heir presumptive: Euan Lovell Tennant
- Remainder to: the 1st Barons’s heirs male of the body lawfully begotten
- Subsidiary titles: Tennant Baronets, of The Glen and St Rollox
- Status: Extant
- Seat: The Glen
- Former seat: Mustique Island

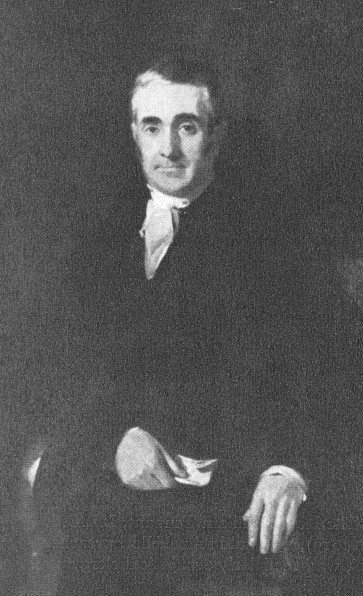
The industrialist Charles Tennant, ancestor of the Barons Glenconner

Baron Glenconner, of The Glen in the County of Peebles, is a title in the Peerage of the United Kingdom. It was created in 1911 for Sir Edward Tennant, 2nd Baronet, who had earlier represented Salisbury in the House of Commons as a Liberal and also served as Lord Lieutenant of Peeblesshire. Lord Glenconner was succeeded by his second son, the second baron. The latter was succeeded in 1983 by his eldest son, the third baron, who bought the island of Mustique. As of 2014, the titles are held by the third baron's grandson, the fourth baron, who became the next-to-youngest peer in the realm when he succeeded in August 2010.

The Tennant baronetcy, of The Glen and St Rollox, was created in the Baronetage of the United Kingdom in 1885 for Charles Tennant, a businessman and Liberal member of parliament. He was the grandson of the chemist and industrialist Charles Tennant. Tennant was succeeded by his fourth son, the aforementioned second baronet, who was elevated to the peerage in 1911.

The seat of the baronetcy is Glen House, near Peebles, under the hill named Minchmuir.

== Tennant baronets, of The Glen and St Rollox (1885) ==
- Sir Charles Clow Tennant, 1st Baronet (1823–1906)
- Sir Edward Priaulx Tennant, 2nd Baronet (1859–1920) (created Baron Glenconner in 1911)

=== Barons Glenconner (1911) ===
- Edward Priaulx Tennant, 1st Baron Glenconner (1859–1920)
  - Hon. Edward Wyndham Tennant (1897–1916), eldest son of the 1st Baron, killed in action in World War I, without issue.
- Christopher Grey Tennant, 2nd Baron Glenconner (1899–1983), second son of the 1st Baron.
- Colin Christopher Paget Tennant, 3rd Baron Glenconner (1926–2010), eldest son of the 2nd Baron.
  - Hon. Charles Edward Pevensey Tennant (1957–1996), eldest son of the 3rd Baron.
- Cody Charles Edward Tennant, 4th Baron Glenconner (born 1994), grandson of the 3rd Baron through the Hon. Charles Tennant.

The heir presumptive is the present holder's first cousin, Euan Lovell Tennant (born 1983), the son of the Hon. Henry Lovell Tennant (1960–1990), second son of the 3rd Baron, and Teresa "Tessa" Tennant (née Cormack; 1959–2018).

=== Title succession chart ===
Title succession chart, Tennant baronets and Barons Glenconner

Charles Tennant; 1st Baronet; 1823–1906
Baron Glenconner
John Tennant; 1853–?	unknown son 1857–1863	Edward Tennant; 1st Baron Glenconner; 1859–1920
Lt. Hon. Edward Tennant; 1897–1916	Christopher Tennant; 2nd Baron Glenconner; 1899–1983
Colin Tennant; 3rd Baron Glenconner; 1926–2010
Hon. Charles Tennant; 1957–1996	Hon. Henry Tennant; 1960–1990
Cody Tennant; 4th Baron Glenconner born 1994	Euan Tennant born 1983

== Other notable family members ==
Several other members of the Tennant family have also gained distinction:

- The Liberal politician Harold Tennant was a younger son of the first Baronet.
- Margot Asquith (née Tennant), wife of Prime Minister H. H. Asquith, was the daughter of the first Baronet from his first marriage.
- The civil servant and politician Katharine Elliot, Baroness Elliot of Harwood (née Tennant), was the daughter of the first Baronet from his second marriage.
- The war poet Edward Tennant was the eldest son of the first Baron.
- The Hon. Stephen Tennant and the Hon. David Tennant were younger sons of the first Baron.
- The author Emma Tennant was the daughter of the second Baron.
- The model Stella Tennant was the daughter of the Hon. Tobias William Tennant, younger son of the second Baron, by Lady Emma Tennant (née Cavendish), daughter of the 11th Duke of Devonshire (not to be confused with the author Emma Tennant mentioned above).
- Anne Tennant, Dowager Baroness Glenconner (née Coke), is the widow of the third Baron, who served as a Lady-in-Waiting to Princess Margaret and is an author of several memoirs.
