= Les Jolies Eaux =

Former royal residence in St Vincent

- Interactive map of Les Jolies Eaux

Geography
- Location: Caribbean
- Coordinates: 12°51′48″N 61°11′22″W

Administration
- Saint Vincent and the Grenadines

Additional information
- IUCN category V (protected landscape/seascape)
- Area: 10 acres (4.0 ha)

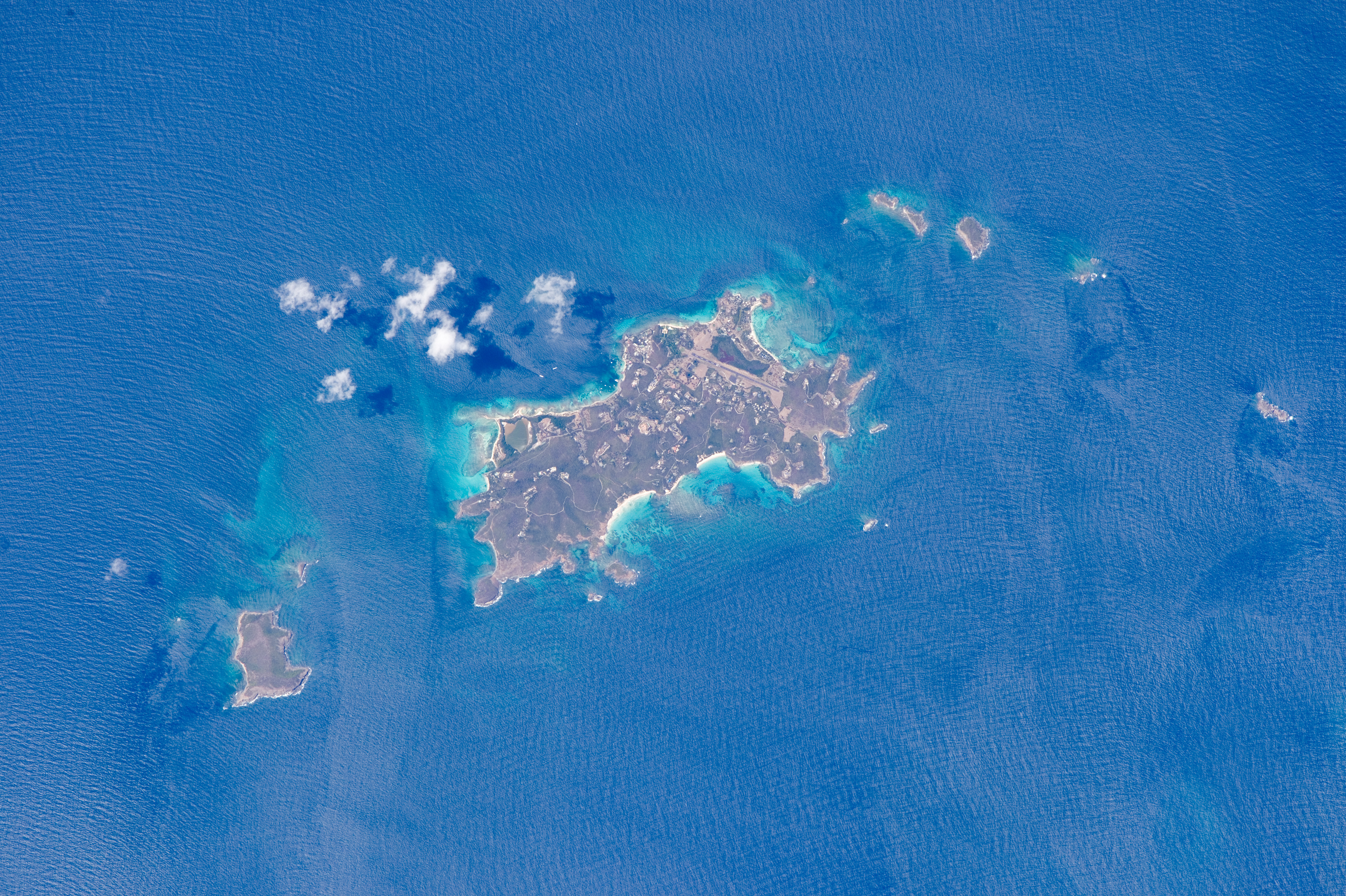
NASA astronaut Tim Kopra tweeted this image with the comment: "Beautiful @Mustique_Island in the Grenadines - can almost see #sandandsurf from here. #beaches from @Space_Station"

Les Jolies Eaux is a former royal residence on a headland on the 1,250-acre (510 ha) island of Mustique, St Vincent and the Grenadines. The villa is in a protected landscape, encompassed by the Caribbean seascape.

The native French name means 'Beautiful Waters' and sits on 10 acres (4.0 ha), given as a wedding present to Princess Margaret in 1959 by Colin Tennant, later Lord Glenconner. The main house, completed in 1972, was designed by the princess's uncle-in-law Oliver Messel in a theatrical neo-Georgian style. Messel incorporated natural elements of the island in his design. It has an open plan with five bedrooms and a drawing room. There are also two lodges, and 10 acres (4.0 ha) of land. This estate was the only property the princess ever owned and she visited regularly, with a range of aristocratic and Hollywood friends.

The house was given to her son David in 1996 as a wedding gift. He subsequently placed it on the market; it sold in 1999 for a reported 2 million dollars. Like most of the villas on Mustique it is available for rent; tariffs range from $35,000 to $50,000 per week (as of 2026), depending on the season.

Les Jolies Eaux has been referenced in 20th and 21st century media including Netflix's The Crown and BBC Two's series Princess Margaret: The Rebel Royal.

== Early history ==
Les Jolies Eaux is a villa situated at the southern tip of Mustique Island. The villa's name is a French term which translates to ‘beautiful waters’. This name was coined by locals as a result of the prime geological location of the property which overlooks the Caribbean Sea and the Atlantic. Mustique is located 18 miles south of St Vincent and sits in the northerly region of the Grenadines, placing the villa in the Caribbean province. The Les Jolies Eaux villa takes up a small proportion of Mustique, measuring up to approximately 10 acres of land.

The estate was given to the princess in 1959 by Colin Tennant, a British aristocrat and socialite, who had purchased the land in 1959 for around $120,000. The land was a wedding gift, to commemorate her marriage to Lord Snowdon. Tennant reportedly asked Princess Margaret whether she would prefer a ‘wrapped gift’ or land on Mustique. He showed Princess Margaret a map of Mustique and pointed out the available piece of headland. Margaret had visited the spot when picnicking at Les Jolies Eaux with Lord Snowdon during their honeymoon in May 1960.

Les Jolies Eaux
- Interactive map of the Les Jolies Eaux area
- Alternative names: 'Beautiful Waters'

General information
- Type: Villa
- Architectural style: Baroque, Neo-classical, Theatrical
- Location: Mustique, Saint Vincent and the Grenadines
- Construction started: 1959
- Completed: 1972
- Owner: Princess Margaret
- Landlord: Lord Glenconner

Technical details
- Floor area: 40,468.6 m^{2} (435,600 sq ft)

Design and construction
- Architect: Oliver Messel
- Architecture firm: The Mustique Company

Website
- www.mustique-island.com/villa/les-jolies-eaux/

== Early ownership ==
Tennant gave the land in a relatively undeveloped state, although he undertook to clear out ‘the wall of undergrowth which blocked any sight of the sea’. The Les Jolies Eaux headland was formerly a sugar plantation, dating back to the 19th century. It had been neglected over time, resulting in excessive amounts of overgrowth and soil erosion. Princess Margaret stated, ‘this is my house’ and this island is ‘the only square inch in the world I own’. It was this transition of ownership from Lord Glenconner to Princess Margaret which altered the architectural, aesthetic and historical landscape of the Les Jolies Eaux villa.

The development of the estate was undertaken by the princess. Eight years after receiving the gift, she began construction. Tennant, who acted as her lead architect, suggested Oliver Messel – uncle of Lord Snowdon and a leading set designer in Britain – to design the villa.

== Oliver Messel ==
Messel was a permanent resident of the Caribbean – due to health issues prohibiting him from travelling – allowing him to oversee the project, and had already designed a number of other cottages and villas in Barbados. Princess Margaret wanted the villa to complement and blend into the "magnificent views". Messel designed a villa with a close attention to detail, synthesising traditional Caribbean architecture with 18th-century European influences.

== Design ==
Les Jolies Eaux is a single-story stone villa with accommodation for ten guests. Messel incorporated English Baroque elements including the convex courtyard. The villa was designed around the pre-existing flora and Messel ensured that the decades-old cedar trees would encompass the villa, acting as a barrier against media intrusion. Messel took advantage of the panoramic views of the Atlantic and Caribbean Sea by installing glass-panelled internal doors and windows to blend the interior and exterior environment. The design features large stained glass windows. Other than the living room, the four bedrooms and the kitchen integrated this Neo-Georgian style as they were organized to be separated into two corresponding wings, aligned on either side of the axis of the house. Down through the terrace, Messel cultivated a garden full of calla lilies, oleanders, hibiscus and bougainvillea. Adjacent to the lawn, laid a pool, which allowed swimmers to be at eye-level with the horizon of the Caribbean Sea.

Messel also had to take into account the tropical weather conditions. The roof was designed to be structurally sound against storms and to allow for rainwater catchments. The flooring consists of decorative Caribbean ceramic tiles, in contrast with bamboo furniture pieces the princess imported from London. These combinations of styles were a deliberate artistic choice of Messel to create the Caribbean Messel architecture. In 2003, Tennant stated that the ‘house had considerable charm’, noting Messel's influence, "Oliver had instilled the essence of the West Indies in a little cottage. It gave Princess Margaret the greatest possible pleasure not to be reminded of the grandeur of what she was". The Princess was also involved in the interior design, choosing furnishings and decorations including Annigoni's portrait of her sister the Queen, which hung in the center of the house.

== Residents and guests ==
Princess Margaret visited the villa frequently, beginning her affair with Roddy Llewellyn there. She had met Llewellyn through the Tennants (the Glenconners). In 1976, paparazzi captured images of the pair, creating a media scandal. Anne Tennant voiced her concerns to biographers about introducing the pair to each other after the affair was publicized stating, "heavens, what have I done?" The affair contributed to the generally poor press coverage the princess received. John Pearson noted in his biography of the royal family that many in Britain decried the expense of the princess's holidays, which saw her described as a "royal parasite".

== Later history ==
In 1996 Princess Margaret gave the property to her son, David Linley, as a wedding gift, and perhaps partly to minimise death duties. Linley subsequently sold the villa in 1999 for £2.4 million, reportedly to the distress of his mother. The estate was sold to an American couple, with Irish links, who simplified the interior design, introducing Irish cultural elements. The villa is available to rent.

== Media appearances ==
Les Jolies Eaux has been referenced in a number of television shows including in the third and fourth series of the Netflix's The Crown. The set production designer, Martin Childs, consulted the archives of Oliver Messel to accurately represent the interior design of Princess Margaret's estate and sought a similar structure for exterior shots, eventually settling on a villa in southern Spain. Les Jolies Eaux was also featured in the second episode of the BBC documentary series, Princess Margaret: The Rebel Royal.
