= Those Wild Wyndhams =

2014 book by Claudia Renton

Those Wild Wyndhams: Three Sisters at the Heart of Power
- Author: Claudia Renton
- Language: English
- Subject: Wyndham sisters
- Publisher: William Collins
- Publication date: January 30, 2014
- Pages: 512
- ISBN: 978-0-00-754491-2

Those Wild Wyndhams: Three Sisters at the Heart of Power is a 2014 book by Claudia Renton that examines the life of the Wyndham sisters– Madeline Wyndham (1869–1941), Pamela Wyndham (1871–1928), and Mary Constance Wyndham (1862–1937).
