= Lady Tennant Stradivarius =

The Lady of Tennant-Lafont Stradivarius is an antique violin made by the Italian luthier Antonio Stradivari of Cremona in 1699. It was made one year before the beginning of his so-called 'golden' period.

Lady Tennant was once owned by the nineteenth century violinist, Charles Philippe Lafont, contemporary of Niccolò Paganini. After the death of Lafont, the violin was acquired by the London violin dealer W.E. Hill & Sons, who in turn sold it to Sir Charles Clow Tennant. This Scottish businessman presented the violin to his wife, Marguerite Agaranthe Miles Tennant, an amateur violinist, as a gift.

On April 22, 2005, the Lady Tennant sold for a record US$2,032,000 at Christie's auction in New York City. It was presented on loan to violinist Yang Liu through the auspices of the Stradivari Society of Chicago. In 2009 it was given on loan to Belgian violinist Yossif Ivanov. It is currently played by Korean-American violinist Julian Rhee, on loan by the Mary B. Galvin Foundation and aided by the efforts of the Stradivari Society.

== See also ==
- Stradivarius
