= Colin Tennant, 3rd Baron Glenconner =

British aristocrat (1926–2010)

The Right Honourable The Lord Glenconner
- Colin Tennant in 1945

Member of the House of Lords
- Lord Temporal
- In office 4 October 1983 – 11 November 1999 as a hereditary peer
- Preceded by: The 2nd Baron Glenconner
- Succeeded by: Seat abolished (Note: Pursuant to the House of Lords Act 1999.)

Personal details
- Born: Colin Christopher Paget Tennant; 1 December 1926 Chelsea, London, England
- Died: 27 August 2010 (aged 83) near Soufrière, Saint Lucia
- Party: Liberal Democrats
- Spouse: Lady Anne Coke (m. 1956)
- Children: Joshua Bowler; Hon. Charles Edward Pevensey Tennant; Hon. Henry Lovell Tennant; Hon. Christopher Cary Tennant; Hon. Flora Creasy; Hon. Amy Tennant
- Parents: Christopher Tennant, 2nd Baron Glenconner; Pamela Winefred Paget
- Other titles: 4th Baronet

Colin Christopher Paget Tennant, 3rd Baron Glenconner (1 December 1926 – 27 August 2010), was a British peer, landowner and socialite. He was the son of Christopher Tennant, 2nd Baron Glenconner, and Pamela Winifred Paget. He was also the nephew of Edward Tennant and Stephen Tennant, and the half-brother of the novelist Emma Tennant.

Before succeeding to the peerage in 1983, he had travelled widely, especially in India and the West Indies. He was an avid socialite and a close friend of Princess Margaret, to whom his wife, the former Lady Anne Coke, was a lady-in-waiting. In 1958, he purchased the island of Mustique in The Grenadines for £45,000.

== Early life ==
Colin Tennant was born on 1 December 1926 at 76 Sloane Street in Chelsea, London, the son of the second Baron Glenconner. His mother, Pamela, was the daughter of Sir Richard Paget, 2nd Baronet. After his parents divorced in 1935, he was educated at Scaitcliffe and Eton College, but for years, Tennant rarely saw his father. Holidays from Eton were spent with his maternal grandmother, Lady Muriel Paget, a formidable grande dame, who diverted a train from the Crimea to Siberia in World War I to save the lives of 70 British nannies.

After finishing his schooling at Eton, Tennant enlisted in the Irish Guards, serving during the tail end of World War II and attaining the rank of lieutenant.

After the war, he attended New College, Oxford. At Oxford, he gained a reputation for being "terribly kind to plain girls with nice manners and extremely waspish to pretty ones with nasty manners". It was at this time that he became interested in motorcycles, where he spent much of his spare time riding his Rudge-Whitworth. Many days were spent riding through the Oxfordshire countryside.

After graduating, he worked for the family's merchanting business, C. Tennant, Sons & Co, and at the same time, began to attract the attention of the gossip columns as Princess Margaret's escort. In the early 1950s, he was often involved in amateur dramatics. In 1953, he took part, with Princess Margaret, in a production for charity of an Edgar Wallace play, The Frog. Tennant played the title role (a serial killer), and the Princess was Assistant Stage Director.

It was during this period that Tennant was spotted as a possible husband for Princess Margaret, who had been publicly hurt by the collapse of her hopes of marrying the divorced commoner Group Captain Peter Townsend in 1953. In 1954, Tennant was forced to deny newspaper reports that he would shortly announce his engagement to the Princess. "I don't expect she would have had me," he said in later years. Princess Margaret met her future husband Tony Armstrong-Jones, who was hired to take wedding pictures at Tennant's 1956 wedding to Lady Anne Coke.

== Mustique island ==
After purchasing the Caribbean island of Mustique in 1958, Tennant built a new village for its inhabitants, planted coconut palms, vegetables, and fruit, and developed the fisheries.

In 1960, the British royal yacht Britannia carried Princess Margaret and her husband, now Lord Snowdon, on a honeymoon cruise around the Caribbean. The royal couple visited Mustique to accept a wedding gift from Tennant, a plot of land on which the Princess was to build her holiday retreat, Les Jolies Eaux.

The cost of running Mustique depleted Glenconner's family fortune, and he was obliged to take on business partners. Eventually, he went into self-exile on St. Lucia, where assisted by Iranian investors, he built and for many years ran the "Bang Between the Pitons" restaurant. After about three years, the restaurant, constructed as "an almost exact copy of Oliver Messel's stage set for the 1950s Broadway musical House of Flowers", went bankrupt. It was eventually resurrected by the Hilton chain of hotels as the Jalousie Bar, part of the Jalousie Resort.

Glenconner and his involvement in Mustique have been the subject of multiple documentaries. In 1971, he was interviewed by Alan Whicker for an episode of Whicker's World set on the island. In 2000, a documentary by Joseph Bullman titled The Man Who Bought Mustique, included Glenconner's first visit to Mustique since his exile. According to a reviewer, Tennant's "occasionally dictatorial manner" was "amply displayed" in the documentary. To describe Tennant, he wrote, "You had to imagine your most crotchety uncle on his worst day and magnify that tenfold."

== Later life ==
In 1963, his father, the 2nd Baron Glenconner, sold the family business to Consolidated Gold Fields, and Tennant suddenly inherited £1 million. At first, father and son were retained as chairman and deputy chairman, but after his father's retirement in 1967, Tennant failed to become chairman and resigned. The Tennants became significant landowners and industrialists over the years. Part of their land was in the West Indies, including a neglected 15,000 acres in Trinidad.

== Family and inheritance ==
On 21 April 1956, Tennant married Lady Anne Veronica Coke. Lady Anne is the daughter of Thomas Coke, 5th Earl of Leicester. Lady Anne had been one of Queen Elizabeth II's Maids of Honour at the 1953 coronation, and was also a close friend and lady-in-waiting of the Queen's sister, Princess Margaret.

Lord and Lady Glenconner had five children, three sons and twin daughters:

- Hon. Charles Edward Pevensey Tennant (15 February 1957 – 19 October 1996; aged 39). He married Sheilagh Scott in 1993. He developed a heroin addiction and died of Hepatitis C. His son Cody Charles Edward Tennant (born 2 February 1994) became the 4th baron. He is married to Rebeka McDonald. They have two children together.
- Hon. Henry Lovell Tennant (21 February 1960 – 2 January 1990; aged 29). He died from AIDS. He married Tessa Cormack (1959–2018) in 1983; their son, Euan Lovell Tennant (born 1983), is the current heir presumptive to the barony. Euan is married to Helen Tennant. They have two children together.
- Hon. Christopher Cary Tennant (born 25 April 1968). He suffered severe brain damage in a motorcycle accident in 1987. He married Anastasia Papadakos in 1996. The couple later divorced. They have daughters Bella Tennant (b. 1997) and Demetra Tennant (b. 2000). Married secondly Johanna Lissack Hurn on 11 February 2011.
- Hon. Flora May Pamela Tennant (born 8 November 1970), a god-daughter of Princess Margaret. She married Anton Ronald Noah Creasy on 18 April 2005. They have two daughters together.
- Hon. Amy Jasmine Elizabeth Tennant (born 8 November 1970). No issue.

Colin Tennant inherited the peerage title and the Tennant baronetcy, along with the family's Scottish estate of The Glen, in 1983, on his father's death. The couple came to divide their time between their house on St. Lucia and their home in England. With his daughter May and her husband, Anton, Glenconner began developing the Beau Estate property between the Pitons. As his eldest son, the Hon. Charles Edward Pevensey Tennant (1957–1996), predeceased him, Glenconner was succeeded by his grandson, Cody Charles Edward Tennant (born 2 February 1994).

In December 2009, Tennant, then aged 83, learned he was also the father of London psychotherapist Joshua Bowler (born 1955). Bowler's mother, the artists' model and bohemian Henrietta Moraes, had become pregnant following a weekend spent with Tennant after the New Year's Eve 1954 Chelsea Arts Club Ball. She never told Tennant about the pregnancy and married the actor Norman Bowler seven months later. The couple divorced two and a half years later.

After Moraes died in 1999, Joshua Bowler decided to investigate his parentage and wrote to Tennant after a mutual friend recalled seeing the young Tennant and Moraes leave the 1954 ball together. A paternity test revealed that Tennant was indeed Bowler's father, news Tennant regarded as "quite magical". Tennant later announced his intention to recognise him in his will.

When Lord Glenconner died in 2010, it was revealed that he had made a new will shortly before his death, leaving all his assets to an employee, Kent Adonai. The family contested this will, and after several years of legal battles, the estate was divided between Cody Charles Edward Tennant and Adonai, with the case ruling in Adonai's favour.

== In popular culture ==
Colin Tennant is portrayed by Pip Carter and Richard Teverson in the Netflix television series The Crown. Anne is played by Grace Stone and Nancy Carroll. Colin is portrayed by Jonathan Hansler in the television film The Queen's Sister (2005).

In 2019, Lady Glenconner's memoir, Lady in Waiting: My Extraordinary Life in the Shadow of the Crown, was published by Hodder & Stoughton. "I married all of my husband", she writes. "Colin could be charming, angry, endearing, hilariously funny, manipulative, vulnerable, intelligent, spoilt, insightful and fun."

== Arms ==
Coat of arms of Colin Tennant, 3rd Baron Glenconner
Crest A mast with a sail hoisted Proper. Escutcheon Argent two crescents in fess Sable on a chief Gules a boar's head couped of the first a bordure compony of the second and first. Supporters Dexter a stag Proper gorged with a mural crown Or sinister a tiger also Proper gorged with a crown palissado also Or each charged on the shoulder with a thistle leaved and slipped Gold. Motto Deus Dabit Vela (God Will Fill The Sails)

== Notes ==
Peerage of the United Kingdom
Preceded by Christopher Tennant	Baron Glenconner; 1983–2010; Member of the House of Lords (1983–1999)	Succeeded by Cody Tennant
Baronetage of the United Kingdom
Preceded by Christopher Tennant	Baronet of The Glen and St Rollox; 1983–2010	Succeeded by Cody Tennant
