= Matthew Yorke =

British novelist and editor (born 1958)

Matthew Yorke (born 24 November 1958) is a British novelist and editor.

Yorke is the son of novelist Emma Tennant and Sebastian Yorke, son of Henry Green.

His novels include:

The March Fence (Penguin, 1988), winner of the John Llewellyn Rhys Prize.

Chancing It (Waywiser Press, 2005), Book of the Year Nominations: The Scotsman, The Daily Telegraph, Times Literary Supplement.

Pictures of Lily (Corsair, 2010), shortlisted for Not the Booker Prize.

Fish Tale (Cogito, 2022). Book of the Year, The Spectator.

He has also edited Surviving: The Uncollected Works of Henry Green (his grandfather, whose real name was Henry Yorke).
