= Tessa Tennant =

English environmentalist and businesswoman (1959–2018)

Tessa Tennant OBE
- Born: Teresa Mary Cormack; 29 May 1959; Bletchingley, Surrey, England
- Died: 7 July 2018 (aged 59)
- Education: King's College London
- Occupations: Environmentalist, businesswoman
- Spouses: Henry Lovell Tennant (m. 1983; died 1990) Bill Staempfli (m. 2007)
- Children: 1

Teresa Mary "Tessa" Tennant OBE (née Cormack; 29 May 1959 – 7 July 2018) was a British advocate of sustainable investment. She co-founded one of the UK's first green investment funds. She was a pioneer in the field of responsible investment and was described by The Economist in its obituary notice as "a giant of green finance."

== Life and career ==
Tennant was born in Bletchingley, Surrey, the youngest daughter and third of four children of Hon. Gwendoline Rita Jean Davis Cormack (née Davies) and John MacRae Cormack, an oil company engineer. Her mother was the daughter of David Davies, first Baron Davies, a Welsh Liberal politician and philanthropist. After attending Prior's Field School, Godalming, Tennant studied for a degree in human environmental studies at King's College London. Following her graduation, she worked for the Green Alliance in the early 1980s. Subsequently, Tennant co-founded the UK's first green investment fund, the Merlin (now Jupiter) Ecology Fund, in 1988.

During her career, Tennant helped lead and found several influential organisations for green and responsible investors including UKSIF, AsRIA and the Carbon Disclosure Project. Among other roles, she served as a director of the Green Investment Bank.

During her career, Tennant was a pioneer in the field of responsible investment. She led the creation and was first Chair of the Association for Sustainable and Responsible Investment in Asia based in Hong Kong (ASrIA), and The Carbon Disclosure Project (CDP), which works with over 18,700 of the largest corporations and 1,100 local governments in the world to reduce their environmental impact.

== Awards and honours ==
In June 2018, the Financial Times/IFC Transformational Business Awards presented Tennant with its inaugural Lifetime Achievement Award and announced that this award would be named after her in future.

In 2018, she was awarded an OBE in recognition of her services to sustainable investment. She received her OBE at Holyrood Palace.

== Marriage and family ==
Tennant met her husband-to-be, Henry Lovell Tennant, in South America during her gap year. He was the second son of Colin Tennant, 3rd Baron Glenconner, and Anne Tennant, Baroness Glenconner (née Coke), lady in waiting to Princess Margaret. The couple married in 1983, and she became The Hon. Mrs. Henry Tennant. They separated after two years but did not divorce, remaining close friends. Henry Tennant died from AIDS in 1990. The couple's son, Euan (born 1983), manages The Glen, the Tennant family estate in the Scottish borders.

In 2007, she married Bill Staempfli, a New York-born architect.

== Death ==
On 7 July 2018, Tennant died of ovarian cancer aged 59. She spent her last months at The Glen with her family.

A testimonial in The Economist paid tribute to her networking skills and ability to work with and influence diverse groups by describing her as "A rainmaker who cajoled the religious and made them greener."
