= Wilsford cum Lake =

Civil parish in Wiltshire, England

Coordinates: 51.157°N 1.809°W

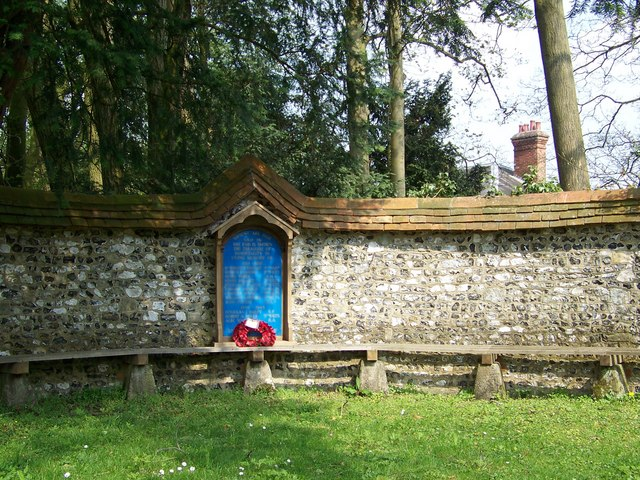
- War Memorial, Wilsford

- Location within Wiltshire
- Population: 191 (in 2011)
- OS grid reference: SU135398
- Civil parish: Wilsford cum Lake
- Unitary authority: Wiltshire
- Ceremonial county: Wiltshire
- Region: South West
- Country: England
- Sovereign state: United Kingdom
- Post town: Salisbury
- Postcode district: SP4
- Dialling code: 01980
- Police: Wiltshire
- Fire: Dorset and Wiltshire
- Ambulance: South Western
- UK Parliament: East Wiltshire

Wilsford cum Lake is a civil parish in the Woodford valley in Wiltshire, England. The parish is bounded to the east by the Salisbury Avon and contains the small settlements of Wilsford, Normanton and Lake. Wilsford is about 2 miles (3.2 km) southwest of Amesbury and 6 miles (10 km) north of Salisbury.

== History ==
The parish is rich in archaeological features, and lies within the Stonehenge World Heritage Site. The scheduled monuments at Normanton Down include a Neolithic long barrow and some 40 Bronze Age round barrows.

Three estates were recorded in the Domesday Book of 1086, with 19 households. A chapel at Lake belonged to Bradenstoke Priory in the early 12th century; it fell into disuse before the 16th century. By the early 13th century, the two adjacent church parishes of Wilsford and Woodford supported a prebendary at Salisbury.

A small Church of England school was built at Wilsford in 1857, extended in 1915 and closed in 1960.

Normanton was transferred from Durnford to the parish in 1885.

== Notable buildings ==
The parish church of St Michael is from the 12th century but was largely rebuilt in 1852 by T.H. Wyatt. Wall monuments inside the church include an engraved slate tablet by Eric Gill. The church was designated as Grade II* listed in 1958.

Wilsford House, near the church, is also Grade II* listed. The house was built in 17th-century style by Detmar Blow in 1904–1906 for Sir Edward Tennant, a Scottish politician who was Member of Parliament for Salisbury from 1906 to 1910. The house was inherited by Sir Edward's son, Stephen Tennant, a leading member of the "bright young things" social set. Author V. S. Naipaul rented a cottage in the grounds and much of his 1987 novel The Enigma of Arrival is based on the surrounding area.

Normanton Manor was the retirement home of Sir Oliver Lodge (1851–1940), the physicist and writer who was involved in the development of radio.

Lake House, dating from 1578, is Grade I listed and has Grade II listed gardens. It was built for George Duke, a clothier, and remained in the Duke family until 1897. Restoration was carried out by Detmar Blow at that time, and again after 1912 following a major fire.

== Governance ==
Wilsford cum Lake parish does not elect a parish council; instead the first tier of local government is a parish meeting, which all electors are entitled to attend. Wiltshire Council, a unitary authority, is responsible for all significant local government functions.

For Westminster elections, the parish is part of the East Wiltshire constituency.
