= Stephen Tennant =

British aristocrat and socialite (1906–1987)

The Honourable Stephen Tennant
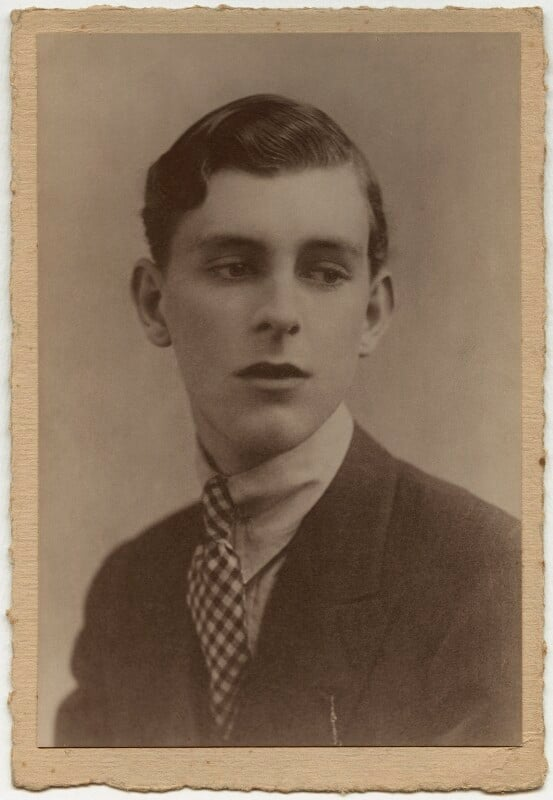
- Tennant, 1920–1925
- Born: Stephen James Napier Tennant; 21 April 1906; Wilsford cum Lake, Wiltshire, England
- Died: 28 February 1987 (aged 80); Wilsford cum Lake, Wiltshire, England
- Known for: One of the "Bright Young Things"
- Partner: Siegfried Sassoon (1927–1933)
- Parents: Edward Tennant, 1st Baron Glenconner (father); Pamela Wyndham (mother)
- Relatives: Margot Asquith, Countess of Oxford and Asquith (paternal aunt); Edward Grey, 1st Viscount Grey of Fallodon (stepfather); Edward Tennant (brother); David Tennant (brother); Emma Tennant (niece); Stella Tennant (great-niece)

Stephen James Napier Tennant (21 April 1906 – 28 February 1987) was a British socialite, writer, and artist known for his decadent, eccentric lifestyle. He was a central member of the socialite group referred to as "Bright Young Things" by the tabloid press of the time. Tennant was noted for his affected demeanor and appearance.

== Early life ==
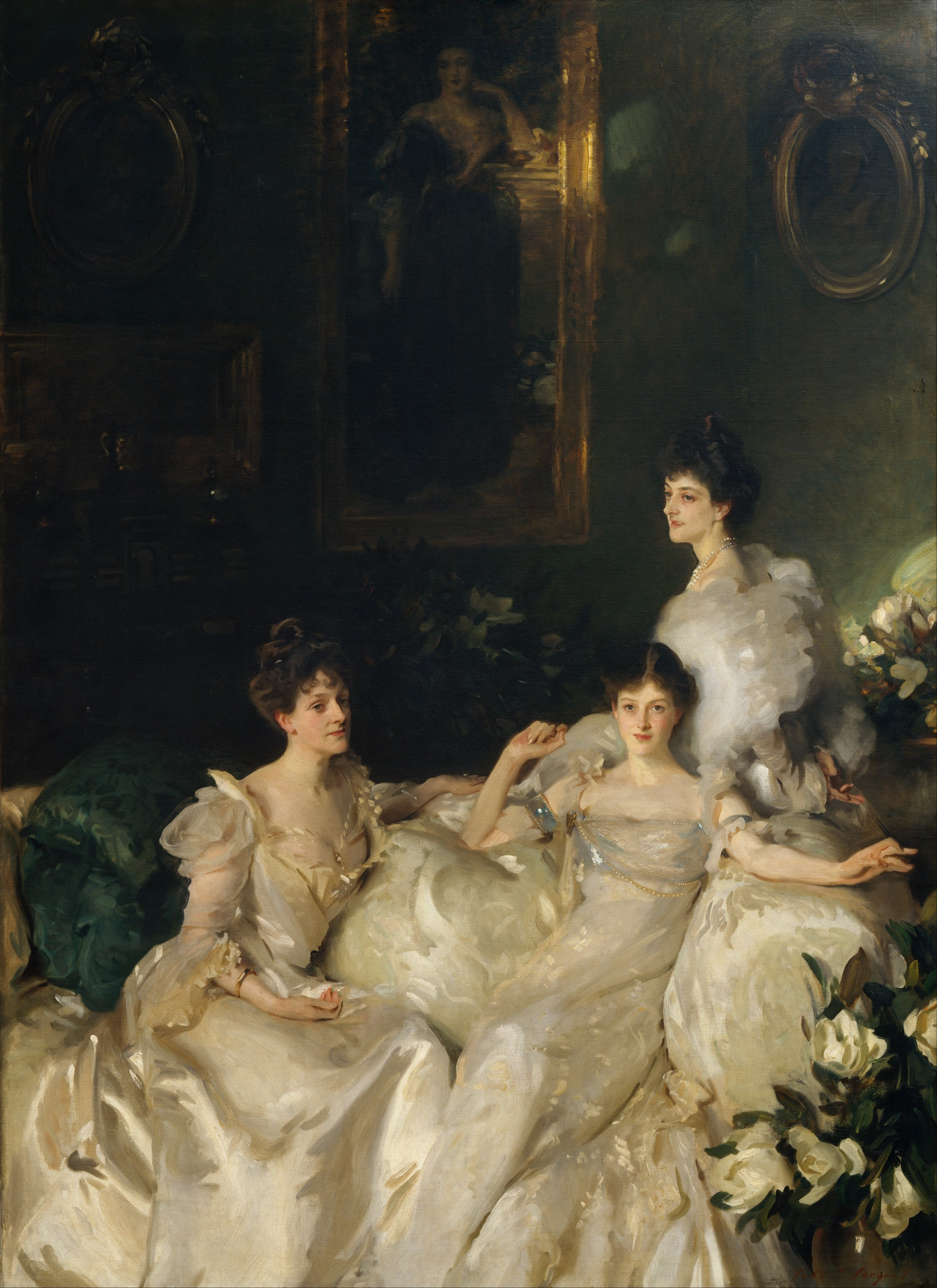
The Wyndham Sisters, by John Singer Sargent, 1899 (Metropolitan Museum)

Tennant was born into a Scottish business and political dynasty, the youngest son of Edward Tennant, 1st Baron Glenconner, who became a peer when Tennant was a child, and the former Pamela Wyndham, one of the Wyndham sisters and of The Souls clique. He was an "uncommonly beautiful boy." His mother was a cousin of Lord Alfred Douglas (1870–1945), Oscar Wilde's lover. On his father's death, Tennant's mother married Edward Grey, 1st Viscount Grey of Fallodon. Tennant's eldest brother Edward – "Bim" – was killed in the First World War. His elder brother David Tennant founded the Gargoyle Club in Soho.

=== Social set ===
During the 1920s and 1930s, Tennant was an important member – the "Brightest", it is said – of the "Bright Young Things". His friends included Rex Whistler, Cecil Beaton, the Sitwells, Lady Diana Manners, Greta Garbo, and the Mitford girls. He entertained them at his estate, known for its "extensive grounds and lavish interiors."

He is widely considered to be the model for Cedric Hampton in Nancy Mitford's novel Love in a Cold Climate, one of the inspirations for Lord Sebastian Flyte in Evelyn Waugh's Brideshead Revisited, and a model for the Hon. Miles Malpractice in some of Waugh's other novels.

== Writing ==
Tennant wrote and illustrated a short book entitled "Leaves from a Missionary's Notebook: The Adventures of Felix Littlejohn," which was originally published in a limited edition in 1929 and reissued in 1986 in celebration of Tennant's 80th birthday. It is a story about the adventures of a missionary sent to the South Seas. For most of his life, Tennant tried to start or finish a novel – Lascar: A Story You Must Forget. It is popularly believed that he spent the last 17 years of his life in bed at the house he inherited from his parents, Wilsford House at Wilsford cum Lake, Wiltshire, which he had redecorated by Syrie Maugham.

Though undoubtedly idle, he was not truly lethargic: he made several visits to the United States and Italy, and developed many friendships. His later reputation as a recluse became true only towards the last years of his life. Yet even then, his life was not uneventful: he became landlord to V. S. Naipaul, who immortalised Tennant in his novel The Enigma of Arrival.

== Personal life ==
During the 1920s and 1930s Tennant had a long sexual affair with the poet Siegfried Sassoon. Prior to this he had proposed to a friend, Elizabeth Lowndes, but had been rejected (Philip Hoare relates how Tennant discussed plans with Lowndes about bringing his nanny with them on their honeymoon).

His relationship with Sassoon (twenty years his senior), however, was to be his most important: it lasted some six years before Tennant off-handedly put an abrupt end to it and Sassoon was reportedly devastated.

When Tennant died in 1987, he had outlived most of his contemporaries. A large archive of his letters, scrapbooks, personal ephemera and artworks are held in The Viktor Wynd Museum of Curiosities, Fine Art & Natural History in Hackney, London.

== In popular culture ==
The character of Cedric Hampton in the novel Love in a Cold Climate is based on Tennant.

The character of Miles Malpractice in the novel Vile Bodies is based on Tennant.

He was described extensively in the 2019 memoirs of Anne Tennant, Baroness Glenconner, who married his nephew Colin in 1956. The narrator of Shola von Reinhold's novel LOTE (2020) is obsessed ("transfixed") with Tennant, and mentions him throughout the book.

He was played as a younger man by Calam Lynch and as an older man by Anton Lesser in the 2021 Terence Davies film Benediction.
