= Sir Charles Tennant, 1st Baronet =

Scottish businessman, industrialist and Liberal politician (1823–1906)

Sir Charles Tennant Bt JP DL
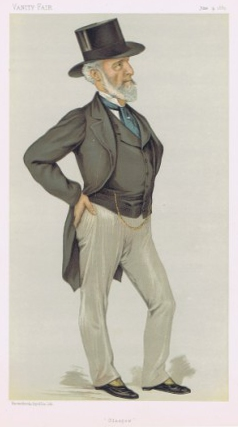
- "Glasgow"; Tennant as caricatured in Vanity Fair, June 1883

Member of Parliament for Peebles and Selkirk
- In office 1880–1886
- Preceded by: Sir Graham Graham-Montgomery
- Succeeded by: Sir Walter Thorburn

Member of Parliament for Glasgow
- In office 1879–1880 Serving with George Anderson, Charles Cameron
- Preceded by: George Anderson, Charles Cameron, Alexander Whitelaw
- Succeeded by: George Anderson, Charles Cameron, Robert Tweedie Middleton

Personal details
- Born: 4 November 1823 Scotland
- Died: 4 June 1906 (aged 82) Broadoaks, Byfleet, Surrey, England
- Party: Liberal
- Spouses: Emma Winsloe (m. 1849; died 1895) Marguerite Miles (m. 1895)
- Children: 12, including Edward, Margot, Harold, Katharine
- Parent(s): John Tennant, Robina Arrol
- Occupation: Banker, industrialist

Sir Charles Clow Tennant, 1st Baronet, JP, DL (4 November 1823 – 4 June 1906) was a Scottish businessman, industrialist and Liberal politician.

== Early life ==
Tennant was the son of John Tennant (1796–1878) and Robina (née Arrol) Tennant. His grandfather was the chemist and industrialist Charles Tennant.

== Career ==
In 1843, he entered the St Rollox chemical works, Glasgow which had been established by his grandfather Charles to produce bleaching powder and other chemicals, and went on to become the largest alkali works in Europe. Sir Charles Tennant was a global industrialist, with business across many continents in railways, steel, explosives, copper, sulphur and merchant banking. Tennant served as President of the United Alkali Company which would become a cornerstone of Imperial Chemical Industries becoming extremely wealthy in the process while being a supporter of political reform, and a major collector of art. Tennant also became Chairman of the Union Bank of Scotland and was the driving force in establishing C. Tennant, Sons & Company as a merchant bank in the City of London.

Tennant also sat as Member of Parliament (MP) for Glasgow from 1879 to 1880 and for Peebles and Selkirk from 1880 to 1886. He unsuccessfully contested Partick at a by-election in 1890. He was appointed Honorary Colonel of the 4th (Glasgow, 1st Northern) Lanarkshire Rifle Volunteer Corps (later 4th Volunteer Battalion, The Cameronians (Scottish Rifles)) in 1880.

He was also a Trustee of the National Gallery and was appointed a Member of the Tariff Commission in 1904. In 1885, he was created a Baronet and held the office of Justice of the Peace and Deputy Lieutenant. Tennant was chairman of Nobel Explosives Company from 1900 to 1906.

== Personal life ==
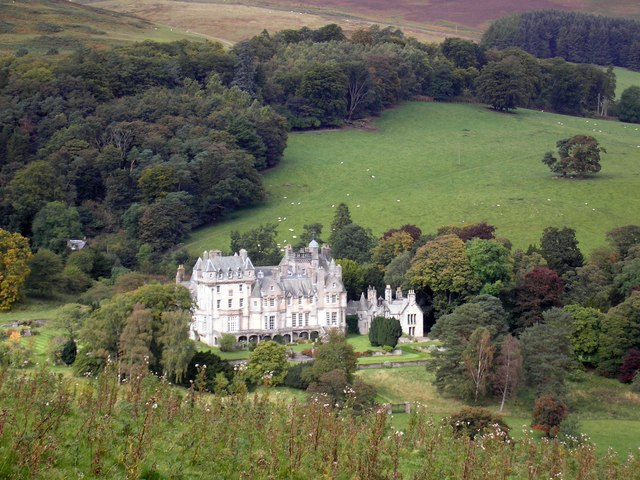
Tennant's house, The Glen in the Scottish Borders.

Tennant was twice married. His first marriage was to Emma Winsloe (1821–1895), daughter of Richard Winsloe of Mount Nebo, Taunton, in 1849. In 1852, he purchased The Glen, an estate in southern Scotland, and commissioned architect David Bryce to design a new house, which was completed in 1855. Together, they were the parents of eight children, including:

- Pauline Emma "Posie" Tennant (1855–1888), who married Thomas Duff Gordon-Duff, 9th of Drummuir and 11th of Park, son of Lachlan Gordon-Duff.
- Charlotte Monckton "Charty" Tennant (1858–1911), who married Thomas Lister, 4th Baron Ribblesdale.
- Edward Priaulx Tennant (1859–1920), who married Pamela Wyndham, a daughter of Percy Wyndham MP.
- Katharine Lucy Tennant (1860–1942), who married Thomas Graham Smith in 1879.
- Francis John "Frank" Tennant (1861–1942), who married Annie Geraldine Redmayne, daughter of John Marriner Redmayne of South Dene.
- Octavia Laura Mary Tennant (1862–1886), who married Alfred Lyttelton.
- Margot Tennant (1864–1945), who was a socialite and author and the second wife of Prime Minister H. H. Asquith.
- Harold John "Jack" Tennant (1865–1935), who became a Liberal politician and married factory inspector May Abraham in 1896.

After her death in 1895 he was remarried to Marguerite Agaranthe Miles (1868–1943), daughter of Charles William Miles and cousin of Sir Philip Miles, in 1898. His second wife was a talented amateur musician and he bought the Lady Tennant Stradivarius for her as a gift. Together, they were the parents of four children, including:

- Margaret Tennant (1899–1994), who married John Loder, 2nd Baron Wakehurst.
- Jean Tennant (1900–1910), who died in childhood.
- Katharine Tennant (1903–1994), who married Walter Elliot and was created Baroness Elliot of Harwood in her own right.
- Nancy Tennant (1904–1969), who married Sylvester Govett Gates, Controller, Ministry of Information. She later married Thomas Dugdale, 1st Baron Crathorne, in 1936.

Sir Charles died in June 1906 in Broadoaks, Byfleet, Surrey, aged 82. He was succeeded in the baronetcy by his son Edward, who was later raised to the peerage as Baron Glenconner in 1911. His widow, Lady Tennant, died in 1943. Sir Charles became one of the oldest men on record to father children, with his four children born to Marguerite Mills while he was between the ages of 76–80.

=== Descendants ===
Through his son Francis, he was a grandfather of Kathleen Tennant, who became the Duchess of Rutland through her 1916 marriage to John Manners, 9th Duke of Rutland. His great-granddaughter Lady Ursula Manners served as a maid of honour to the queen at the Coronation of King George VI and Queen Elizabeth in 1937.

== Arms ==
Coat of arms of Sir Charles Tennant, 1st Baronet
Escutcheon Argent two crescents in fess and a lymphad in the base Sable on a chief Gules a boar's head couped of the first within a bordure company of the second and first.

The Lord Lyon granted Sir Charles arms in 1885. His arms are impaled with the arms of his son-in-law, Walter Elliot, in the arms of his daughter, Katharine Elliot, Baroness Elliot of Harwood.

Parliament of the United Kingdom
Preceded by George Anderson; Charles Cameron; Alexander Whitelaw	Member of Parliament for Glasgow; 1879–1880; With: George Anderson 1879–1880; Charles Cameron 1879–1880	Succeeded by George Anderson; Charles Cameron; Robert Tweedie Middleton
Preceded by Sir Graham Graham-Montgomery, Bt	Member of Parliament for Peebles and Selkirk; 1880–1886	Succeeded by Sir Walter Thorburn
Baronetage of the United Kingdom
New creation	Baronet (of The Glen and St Rollox); 1885–1906	Succeeded by Edward Tennant
