= Edward Tennant, 1st Baron Glenconner =

Scottish businessman and Liberal politician

The Right Honourable The Lord Glenconner
- Lord Glenconner, c. 1900
- Tenure: 1911–1920
- Successor: Christopher Tennant, 2nd Baron Glenconner
- Born: 31 May 1859
- Died: 21 November 1920 (aged 61)
- Spouse: Pamela Wyndham (m. 1895)
- Issue: Clarissa; Edward; Christopher; David; Stephen
- Parents: Sir Charles Tennant, 1st Baronet; Emma Winsloe

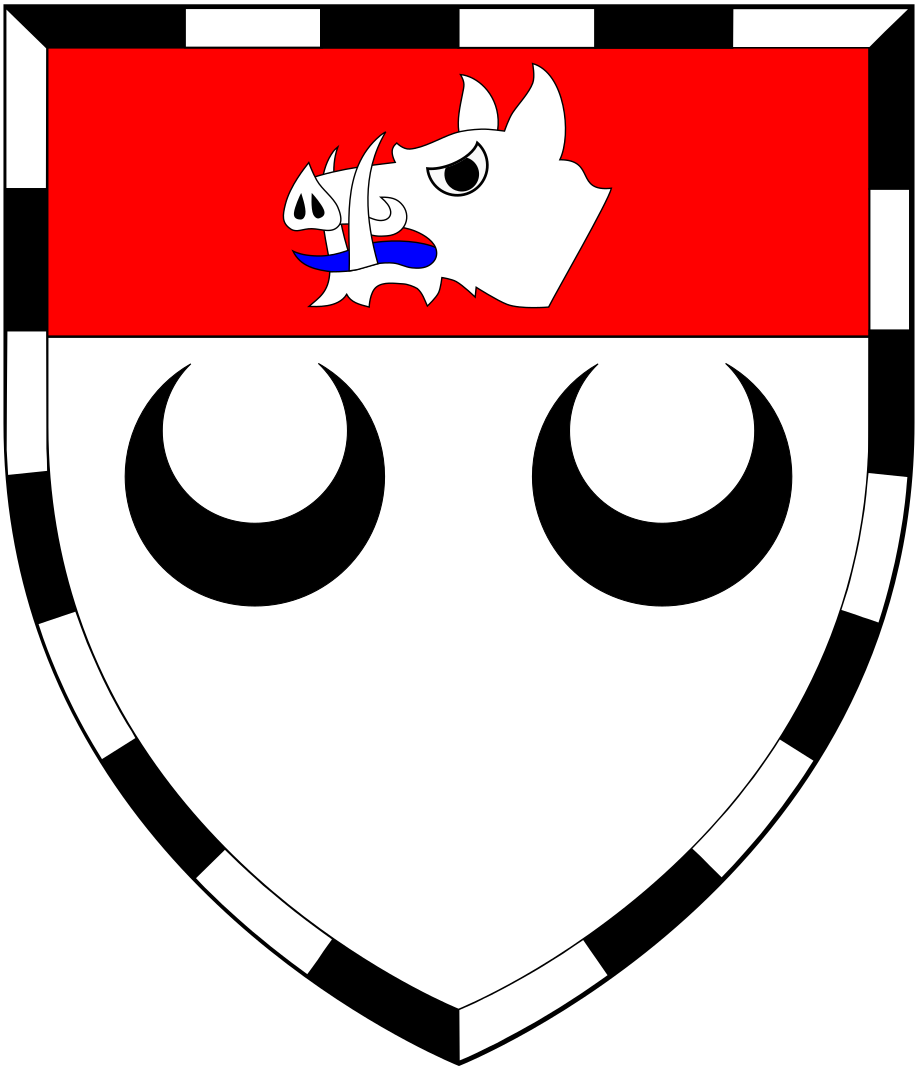
Arms of Tennant: Argent, two crescents in fess sable on a chief gules a boar's head couped of the first

Edward Priaulx Tennant, 1st Baron Glenconner (31 May 1859 – 21 November 1920), known as Sir Edward Tennant, 2nd Baronet from 1906 to 1911, was a Scottish businessman and Liberal politician. In 1911 he was raised to the peerage as Baron Glenconner.

== Origins ==
He was born on 31 May 1859, the eldest surviving son and heir of Sir Charles Tennant, 1st Baronet (d. 1906). His brother was Harold Tennant, and his sister Margot Tennant was the wife of Prime Minister H. H. Asquith. His niece was Elizabeth Bibesco and his nephew Anthony Asquith.

== Career ==
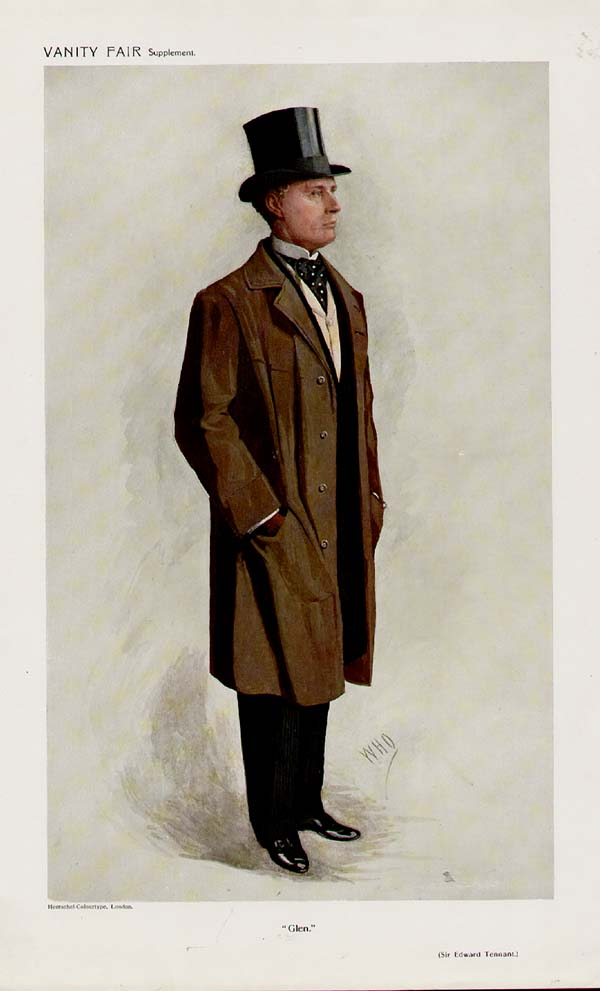
"Glen": caricature by "WHO" published in Vanity Fair in 1910

Educated at Eton and at Trinity College, Cambridge, Tennant travelled extensively in Africa, India, and America, and was Assistant Private Secretary to Sir George Otto Trevelyan, Secretary for Scotland, from 1892 to 1895. He was unsuccessful parliamentary candidate for Partick in 1892 and for Peebles and Selkirk in 1900.

He was elected as Liberal Member of Parliament for Salisbury at the 1906 general election, holding the seat until the 1910 general election. He succeeded his father to the baronetcy in 1906, and in 1911 he was raised to the peerage as Baron Glenconner, of The Glen in the County of Peebles. Lord Glenconner was also Lord High Commissioner to the General Assembly of the Church of Scotland in 1911, 1912, 1913 and 1914, and served as Lord Lieutenant of Peeblesshire from 1908 to 1920.

Between 1883 and 1886 he travelled in South Africa and on the American continent, later visiting India and the Far East. In 1885, he graduated as Master of Arts. (1886 in). In 1892 he contested the Partick Division of Lanarkshire as a Liberal (unsuccessfully).

Between 1892 and 1895 he served as Private Secretary at the Scottish Office to Sir George Trevelyan, who was then Secretary for Scotland. In 1900 he contested Peebles and Selkirk (unsuccessfully), being defeated by sitting member Sir Walter Thorburn. In 1902 he toured the Far East with his wife and was present at the Delhi Durbar.

Between 1906 and 1910 he sat as MP for Salisbury, being defeated in 1910. From 1906 to 1920 he served as Lord Lieutenant of the County of Peebles. Between 1911 and 1914 he served as Lord High Commissioner to the General Assembly of the Church of Scotland, which duty he carried out "with dignity, tact and courtesy, making him notable among the line of holders". He was a frequent worshipper at St Columba's Church, London; he read the lesson on several occasions and interested himself in congregational affairs.

== Other roles ==
- Chairman of the Union Bank of Scotland.
- Director of several companies inc Mysore Gold Company.
- President of the Scottish Modern Arts Association for a time.
- President of the Edinburgh Sir Walter Scott Club.
- Head of the great chemical works of Glasgow (at St Rollox), Tharsis Sulphur and Copper Company, succeeding his father. The family fortunes were laid by his father when he turned to weaving and bleaching and became connected with the great St Rollox chemical works, at Glasgow.
- President of the National Association for the Prevention of Tuberculosis.

== Personal qualities ==
- "He sought neither publicity nor adulation. His spirit was abashed and fugitive rather than forward."
- He was "always eager to extend the hand of courtesy and of pity to those in bodily or mental distress, whether in public institution or private life."
- An extensive traveller, with great business aptitude.
- He brought to public affairs sound judgment and quick decision.
- He was never comfortable among party politics, never at home in either the House of Commons or Lords.
- He exhibited upright conduct, prudent counsel
- From his inherited riches, he was a liberal giver to public charities.
- He took active interest in the county affairs of Peeblesshire and Wiltshire.
- He was more of a businessman than a politician.

== Philanthropy ==
In 1914 he presented to the Corporation of Glasgow 13 acres of land in the St Rollox district as a suitable recreation ground for that part of the city. In 1918 he presented Dryburgh Abbey to the nation to save it from private ruin, which he had bought for it is said £35,000. This act was imitated by others, resulting in Scotland within two years possessing several ancient monuments in this way.

== Residences ==
In 1900 he purchased the estate of Wilsford near Salisbury, where he commissioned Detmar Blow to design a large mansion in the Tudor style, built in 1904–1906. In 1910 he remodelled his London house at 34 Queen Anne's Gate, including an art gallery to house his inherited art collection, and included a separate entrance for the public who were allowed to view the artworks on certain days of the week, which action was "widely appreciated and used".

== Marriage and issue ==
The Wyndham Sisters, by John Singer Sargent (1899), one of whom was Pamela Wyndham, wife of Edward Tennant

In 1895 he married Pamela Wyndham, a writer and a sister of George Wyndham, by whom he had several children, including:

- Hon. Clarissa "Clare" Madeline Georgiana Felicite Tennant (1896–1960)
- Hon. Edward Wyndham Tennant (1897–1916), a war poet
- Christopher Grey Tennant, 2nd Baron Glenconner (1899–1983), second and eldest surviving son and heir. His son was Colin Tennant, 3rd Baron Glenconner, who developed the Caribbean island of Mustique; his daughter was the writer Emma Tennant
- Hon. David Pax Tennant (1902–1968), founder of the Gargoyle Club in Soho, London, who married Hermione Baddeley; his daughter was Pauline Tennant
- Hon. Stephen James Napier Tennant (1906–1987)

== Death and succession ==
He died on 21 November 1920, from heart failure, 10 days after an operation from which he seemed to have rallied. He was cremated at Golders Green Crematorium and his ashes were buried at Traquair, Peeblesshire. He was succeeded in the peerage by his second and eldest surviving son, the Hon. Christopher Tennant.

== Notes ==
Parliament of the United Kingdom
Preceded by Sir Walter Palmer	Member of Parliament for Salisbury; 1906–1910	Succeeded by Godfrey Locker-Lampson
Honorary titles
Preceded by The Lord Elibank	Lord Lieutenant of Peeblesshire; 1908–1920	Succeeded by The Lord Carmichael
Baronetage of the United Kingdom
Preceded by Charles Tennant	Baronet (of The Glen and St Rollox); 1906–1920	Succeeded by Christopher Tennant
Peerage of the United Kingdom
New creation	Baron Glenconner; 1911–1920	Succeeded by Christopher Tennant
