= Emma Tennant =

English fiction writer (1937–2017)

The Honourable Emma Tennant
- Born: Emma Christina Tennant; 20 October 1937; London, England
- Died: 21 January 2017 (aged 79); London, England
- Other name: Catherine Aydy
- Education: St Paul's Girls' School
- Occupations: Novelist, editor
- Spouses: Sebastian Yorke (m. 1957; div. 1962) Christopher Booker (m. 1963; div. 1968) Alexander Cockburn (m. 1968; div. 1973) Tim Owens (m. 2008)
- Children: 3, including Matthew Yorke
- Parent(s): Christopher Tennant, 2nd Baron Glenconner; Elizabeth Powell
- Relatives: Edward Tennant (uncle); Stephen Tennant (uncle); Colin Tennant, 3rd Baron Glenconner (half-brother); Stella Tennant (niece)

Emma Christina Tennant FRSL (20 October 1937 – 21 January 2017) was an English novelist and editor of Scottish extraction, known for a post-modern approach to her fiction, often imbued with fantasy or magic. Several of her novels give a feminist or dreamlike twist to classic stories, such as Two Women of London: The Strange Case of Ms Jekyll and Mrs Hyde. She also published under the pseudonym Catherine Aydy.

== Early life ==
Tennant was of Scottish extraction, the daughter of Christopher Grey Tennant, 2nd Baron Glenconner, and Elizabeth, Lady Glenconner (née Powell). She remembered her father as a mix of rage and benevolence. She was the niece of Edward and Stephen Tennant, and the half-sister of Colin Tennant, later the third Baron Glenconner, from her father's first marriage.

Born in London, she spent the World War II years at the family's faux Gothic mansion The Glen in Peeblesshire. Her parents were regularly absent, while The Glen "was the strangest possible place. I knew no other world at all until I was nine." The family then resettled in London. Tennant was educated at St Paul's Girls' School, but left when she was 15. She spent some time at an Oxford finishing school, studying languages and the history of art, and a year in Paris at The Louvre. In the mid-1960s, her parents built a house in Corfu, known as Rovinia. She spent much time there throughout her life and later in 2001, published a book about the building of the house, entitled A House in Corfu.

== Career ==
Tennant worked as a travel writer for Queen magazine and an editor for Vogue. Her first novel, The Colour of Rain, was published under the pseudonym Catherine Aydy (chosen with the help of a ouija board) when she was 26. Submitted to the Spanish Prix Formentor, the response of the chair of the judges, the Italian novelist Alberto Moravia meant that she suffered writer's block for some years afterwards. According to Tennant, he "tossed my book into a wastepaper basket and declared, 'This book stands for the decadence of British contemporary culture.'" It was not until 1973 that her second novel, The Time of the Crack, was first published. Between 1975 and 1979, she edited a literary magazine, Bananas, which helped launch the careers of several young novelists. She was the editor of the Viking series Lives of Modern Women.

A large number of books by Tennant followed: thrillers, children's books, fantasies, and several revisionist takes on classic novels, including a sequel to Pride and Prejudice called Pemberley. In later years, she began to treat her own life in such books as Girlitude and Burnt Diaries (both published in 1999), the second of which details her affair with Ted Hughes. "He was so odd – to put it mildly," she wrote. The French Dancer's Bastard, which recounts the life of Adèle, the daughter of Mr Rochester from Jane Eyre, was published in October 2006. The Autobiography of the Queen, written with Hilary Bailey, was published in October 2007.

== Personal life ==
Tennant was married four times, including to the journalist and author Christopher Booker between 1963 and 1968 and the political writer Alexander Cockburn between 13 December 1968 and 1973. She had one son and two daughters. Her son, from her first marriage, is the author Matthew Yorke. Her older daughter Daisy, from her marriage to Cockburn, teaches the Alexander technique. Her younger daughter Rose Dempsey, from a relationship with the publisher Michael Dempsey, works for the Serpentine Galleries. A lifelong supporter of the Labour Party, she married in April 2008 her partner of 33 years, Tim Owens, saying it was not, or not only, for tax policies introduced by the government of Gordon Brown.

Emma Tennant died on 21 January 2017 in a London hospital from posterior cortical atrophy, a form of Alzheimer's disease.

== Selected bibliography ==
=== Novels ===
- The Colour of Rain (as Catherine Aydy), London: Weidenfeld and Nicolson, 1964
- The Time of the Crack, London: Cape, 1973; as The Crack, London: Penguin, 1978
- The Last of the Country House Murders, London: Cape, 1974; New York, Nelson, 1976
- Hotel de Dream, London: Gollancz, 1976
- The Bad Sister, London: Gollancz; New York: Coward McCann, 1978
- Wild Nights, London: Cape, 1979; New York: Harcourt Brace, 1980
- Alice Fell, London: Cape, 1980
- Queen of Stones, London: Cape, 1982
- Woman Beware Woman, London: Cape, 1983; as The Half-Mother, Boston: Little Brown, 1985
- Black Marina, London: Faber: 1985
- The Adventures of Robina, by Herself, London: Faber, 1986; New York:, Persea, 1987. Series: The Cycle of the Sun The House of Hospitalities, London: Viking, 1987
- A Wedding of Cousins, London: Viking, 1988
- The Magic Drum, London: Viking, 1989
- Two Women of London: The Strange Case of Ms. Jekyll and Mrs. Hyde, London: Faber, 1989 (after Robert Louis Stevenson's The Strange Case of Dr. Jekyll and Mr. Hyde)
- Sisters and Strangers, London: Grafton, 1990
- Faustine, London: Faber: 1991
- Pemberley; or, Pride and Prejudice Continued, New York: St. Martin's Press, 1993; as Pemberley: A Sequel to Pride and Prejudice, London: Hodder and Stoughton, 1993
- Tess, London: HarperCollins, 1993
- An Unequal Marriage; or, Pride and Prejudice Twenty Years Later, London: Sceptre; New York: St. Martin's Press, 1994
- Travesties, London and Boston: Faber and Faber, 1995.
- Emma in Love: Jane Austen's Emma Continued, London: Fourth Estate, 1996

=== Non-fiction ===
- A House in Corfu, London: Jonathan Cape, 2001

=== Autobiography ===
- Strangers: A Family Romance, London: Jonathan Cape, 1998
- Girlitude, London: Jonathan Cape, 1999
- Burnt Diaries, Edinburgh: Canongate, 1999
