= Anne Tennant, Baroness Glenconner =

British peeress and socialite

The Right Honourable The Dowager Lady Glenconner LVO
- Born: Anne Veronica Coke; 16 July 1932 (age 94); Kensington, London, England
- Spouse: Colin Tennant, 3rd Baron Glenconner (m. 1956; died 2010)
- Issue: The Hon. Charles Tennant; The Hon. Henry Tennant; The Hon. Christopher Tennant; The Hon. May Creasy; The Hon. Amy Tennant
- Parents: Thomas Coke, 5th Earl of Leicester; Lady Elizabeth Yorke

Anne Veronica Tennant, Dowager Baroness Glenconner, LVO (née Coke; born 16 July 1932) is a British peeress, socialite and author. The daughter of the 5th Earl of Leicester, she served as a maid of honour at the coronation of Elizabeth II in 1953 and was an extra lady-in-waiting to Princess Margaret, Countess of Snowdon, from 1971 until the Princess's death in 2002. Her memoir, Lady in Waiting: My Extraordinary Life in the Shadow of the Crown (2019), became a New York Times Best Seller. She is a close friend of King Charles and Queen Camilla.

== Early life ==
Anne Veronica Coke (pronounced "Cook") was born on 16 July 1932 at 13 Queensberry Place, South Kensington. She is the eldest daughter of the Hon. Thomas Coke and his wife, Lady Elizabeth (née Yorke), the son and daughter of Thomas Coke, Viscount Coke, and Charles Yorke, 8th Earl of Hardwicke, respectively. Her great-grandfather, Thomas Coke, 3rd Earl of Leicester, died in 1941, whereupon her grandfather succeeded as the 4th Earl of Leicester and her father became Viscount Coke. Following her grandfather's death in 1949, her father became the 5th Earl of Leicester. She has two younger sisters, Carey (1934–2018) and Sarah (born 1944). Their father served as equerry to George VI from 1932 to 1952.

Coke spent much of her childhood at the family estate, Holkham Hall in Norfolk. During the Second World War, she and her sister Carey stayed at Cortachy Castle in Angus, Scotland, with their paternal great-aunt, Alexandra, Countess of Airlie, her husband David Ogilvy, 12th Earl of Airlie, and their children, David and Angus.

As Sandringham House lay less than twenty miles from Holkham, Coke was a regular childhood companion of Princess Elizabeth and Princess Margaret. The King and Queen were friends of her parents, and the family was often invited to Christmas parties at Buckingham Palace.

Coke has compared herself to Lady Mary Crawley in Downton Abbey, as she was the eldest of her father’s three daughters and had no brothers, so one day the family estate and peerages would go to a cousin, which in due course they did.

=== Debut and early adulthood ===
In 1950, at the age of eighteen, Coke was presented at court, and was named "debutante of the year" by Tatler. In 1953, she served as one of the maids of honour at the coronation of Elizabeth II in Westminster Abbey. She later became engaged to Johnnie Althorp, father of Diana, Princess of Wales, but the match was ended after his father objected on the grounds of "mad blood", a reference to her Trefusis ancestry, which was shared by institutionalised relatives of the Queen. In 1997, the director of the Murdoch Children's Research Institute suggested that a genetic condition in the Hepburn-Stuart-Forbes-Trefusis family may have caused early childhood deaths in males and learning disabilities in females.

== Marriage and children ==
On 21 April 1956 at St Withburga's Church, Holkham, she married the Hon. Colin Christopher Paget Tennant, son of the 2nd Baron Glenconner. Guests included Queen Elizabeth the Queen Mother and Princess Margaret; the Princess's future husband, Antony Armstrong-Jones, was the wedding photographer.

The Glenconners had five children:

1. The Hon. Charles Edward Pevensey Tennant (15 February 1957 – 19 October 1996), who struggled with heroin addiction but later recovered and married Sheilagh Scott in 1993. Their son, Cody Charles Edward Tennant (born 1994), became the 4th Baron Glenconner in 2010. Charles died of Hepatitis C in October 1996.
2. The Hon. Henry Lovell Tennant (21 February 1960 – 2 January 1990), who married Teresa Cormack in 1983. He died from AIDS. His son, Euan Lovell Tennant (born 1983), is the current heir presumptive to the barony.
3. The Hon. Christopher Cary Tennant (born 25 April 1968), who suffered severe brain damage in a motorcycle accident in 1987. He married Anastasia Papadakos in 1996 and had two children; the marriage later ended in divorce. He married Johanna Lissack Hurn in 2011.
4. The Hon. Flora May Pamela Tennant (born 8 November 1970), a goddaughter of Princess Margaret. She married Anton Ronald Noah Creasy in 2005 and has two children.
5. The Hon. Amy Jasmine Elizabeth Tennant (born 8 November 1970). No issue.

Lord Glenconner succeeded as the 3rd Baron Glenconner on 4 October 1983. The couple divided their time among Mustique, St Lucia, and the United Kingdom. They remained married for 54 years until his death in 2010. After his death, it emerged that he had made a new will leaving his estate to an employee, Kent Adonai. The family contested the will, and after prolonged legal proceedings the estate was divided between Adonai and Cody Tennant, the 4th Baron Glenconner. Lady Glenconner now lives in a farmhouse near King's Lynn, in Norfolk.

== Friendship with Princess Margaret and relationship with the Royal Family ==
In 1960, following Princess Margaret's marriage to Antony Armstrong-Jones, Lord and Lady Glenconner gave the couple a plot of land on Mustique, which Lord Glenconner had purchased in 1958. They commissioned Oliver Messel to design a house for the couple, later named Les Jolies Eaux.

In 1971, Glenconner became an Extra Lady-in-Waiting to Princess Margaret, a role she held until the Princess's death in 2002. She accompanied the Princess on numerous overseas tours, and once represented her on a visit to the Philippines to meet Imelda Marcos when the Princess was ill with pneumonia. Princess Margaret frequently visited her at her Norfolk home, where she would sometimes assist with household tasks such as laying the fire or washing the car.

Lord and Lady Glenconner introduced Princess Margaret to Roddy Llewellyn in 1973, initiating a relationship that lasted eight years and contributed to the breakdown of her marriage to Lord Snowdon. After Princess Margaret's funeral in 2002, the Queen told Lady Glenconner that she was grateful for the introduction, as Llewellyn had "made her really happy".

She was appointed Lieutenant of the Royal Victorian Order in the 1991 Birthday Honours for her personal service to the Royal Family.

Glenconner's memoir, Lady in Waiting: My Extraordinary Life in the Shadow of the Crown, was published in 2019. She stated that she wrote the book because she was "fed up with people writing such horrible things about Princess Margaret", describing Craig Brown's Ma’am Darling as "that horrible book".

Glenconner has been a lifelong friend of King Charles and is close to Queen Camilla. She has spoken about how Queen Camilla encouraged her to open up about her own experiences with domestic abuse. She was invited to the Coronation of Charles III and Camilla in 2023, being one of the few individuals who also took part in the Coronation of Elizabeth II in 1953.

== Career and activism ==
Glenconner has authored seven books, including her bestseller memoir Lady in Waiting: My Extraordinary Life in the Shadow of the Crown (2019), which recounts her life in the royal household and her close friendship with Princess Margaret. Her subsequent publications include the crime novels Murder on Mustique (2020) and A Haunting at Holkham (2021), the memoir Whatever Next? Lessons from an Unexpected Life (2022), Lady Glenconner's Picnic Papers and Other Feasts with Friends (2024), Manners and Mischief: An A–Z of a Life Lived Well (2025) and Trunks and Tiaras: Journeys Through Life with Friends, Family, and a Princess.

Glenconner has also made numerous television and media appearances, including famously appearing on The Graham Norton Show in November 2019 alongside Olivia Colman and Helena Bonham Carter, as well as appearances on Loose Women, The One Show, CBS Mornings and others, including CNN and The Guardian.

In the 1970s, Glenconner worked as a fundraiser for Refuge on the invitation of its founder, Erin Pizzey. She continues to advocate for domestic abuse and sexual violence prevention, and proceeds from her 2024 book, Lady Glenconner's Picnic Papers and Other Feasts with Friends, were given to the charity SafeLives. Because of her support for her son Henry who was diagnosed with HIV/AIDS in the 1980s, Lady Glenconner has been referred to as a "gay icon".

== Awards and honours ==
Country	Date	Appointment	Ribbon	Post-nominal letters
United Kingdom	2 June 1953	Queen Elizabeth II Coronation Medal		
United Kingdom	6 February 1977	Queen Elizabeth II Silver Jubilee Medal		
United Kingdom	14 June 1991	Lieutenant of the Royal Victorian Order		LVO

Coat of arms of Anne Tennant, Baroness Glenconner
Coronet Coronet of a Baroness Escutcheon Colin Tennant, 3rd Baron Glenconner (Argent two crescents in fess Sable on a chief Gules a boar's head couped of the first a bordure compony of the second and first) impaling Thomas Coke, 5th Earl of Leicester (Per pale gules and azure three eagles displayed Argent). Supporters Dexter a stag Proper gorged with a mural crown Or sinister a tiger also Proper gorged with a crown palissado also Or each charged on the shoulder with a thistle leaved and slipped Gold.

== In popular culture ==
- Glenconner is portrayed by Grace Stone in the second, Nancy Carroll in the third and fourth, and Imogen Stubbs in the sixth series of the Netflix television series The Crown.

== Bibliography ==
- The Picnic Papers (edited with Susanna Johnston). London: Hutchinson, 1983. ISBN 009152220X
- Lady in Waiting: My Extraordinary Life in the Shadow of the Crown. London: Hodder & Stoughton, 2019. ISBN 1529359066
- Murder on Mustique. London: Hodder & Stoughton, 2020. ISBN 1529336341
- A Haunting at Holkham. London: Hodder & Stoughton, 2020. ISBN 1529336406
- Whatever Next?: Lessons from an Unexpected Life. London: Hodder & Stoughton, 2022. ISBN 1529395763
- Trunks & Tiaras: Journeys through Life with Friends, Family and a Princess. Bedford Square Publishers, 2026. ISBN 1835016685
