= Edward Tennant (poet) =

British war poet, killed in World War I

Lieutenant The Honourable Edward Tennant
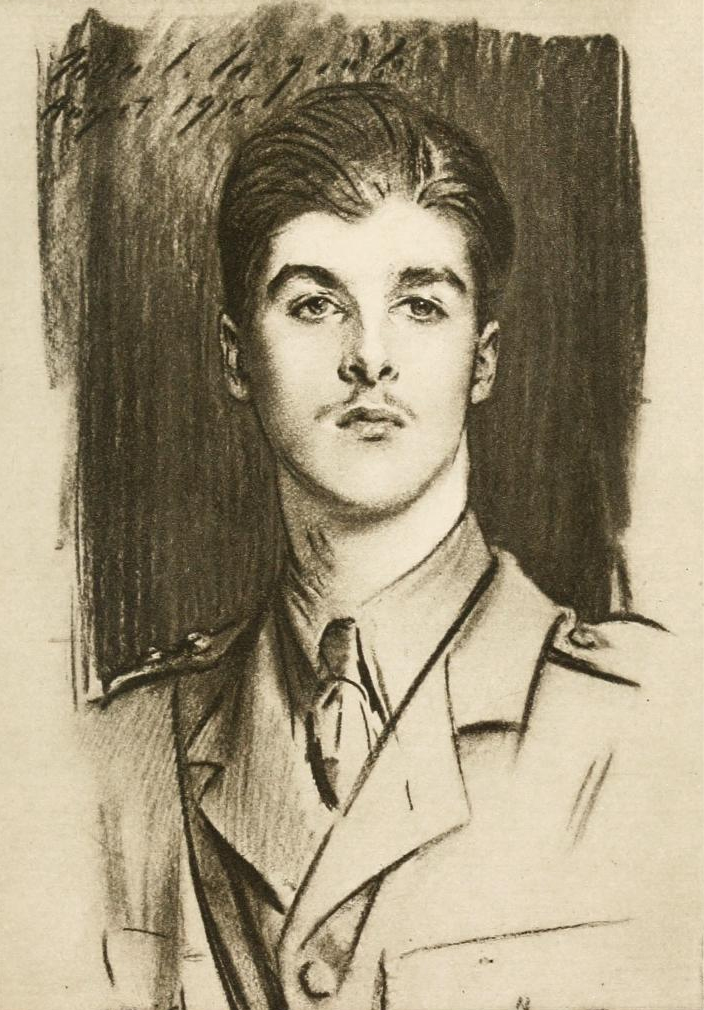
- Portrait drawing of Tennant by John Singer Sargent (1915)
- Born: 1 July 1897; Stockton House, Stockton, Wiltshire, England
- Died: 22 September 1916 (aged 19); Somme, France
- Cause of death: Killed in action
- Resting place: Guillemont Road Cemetery, Guillemont, Somme, France
- Education: Winchester College
- Known for: War poetry
- Parents: Edward Tennant, 1st Baron Glenconner (father); Pamela Wyndham (mother)
- Relatives: Margot Asquith, Countess of Oxford and Asquith (paternal aunt); David Tennant (brother); Stephen Tennant (brother); Emma Tennant (niece); Stella Tennant (grand-niece)
- Military career
- Branch: British Army
- Service years: 1914–1916
- Rank: Lieutenant
- Units: Grenadier Guards
- Conflicts: World War I

Lieutenant Edward Wyndham Tennant (1 July 1897 – 22 September 1916) was a British war poet killed during the Battle of the Somme.

== Early life ==
He was the son of Edward Tennant, who became Lord Glenconner in 1911, and Pamela Wyndham, a writer, and later wife of Edward Grey, 1st Viscount Grey of Fallodon. His younger brothers were the eccentric Stephen Tennant and David Tennant, the founder of the Gargoyle Club.

Born at Stockton House, Stockton, Wiltshire, which his father had just leased from Major-General A. G. Yeatman-Biggs, Tennant was educated at Winchester College. At the age of seventeen he left school and joined the Grenadier Guards in the early weeks of the World War I.

Tennant was known to friends and family as 'Bim', but the origin of this nickname is unknown. It has been suggested that he was engaged before his death to Nancy Cunard, but a reliable source, Colin Tennant, 3rd Baron Glenconner, responded in a letter to a question on this point and stated that the suggestion was incorrect; Lois Gordon, Nancy Cunard's biographer, in her extensive research, never came across any hint of such an alliance either.

== Death and memorial ==
Tennant is buried at Guillemont in France in the Guillemont Road Cemetery, close to the remains of his friend and relative Raymond Asquith (eldest son of Prime Minister H. H. Asquith), who was killed the week before. The inscription on his gravestone reads: KILLED IN ACTION IN HIS TWENTIETH YEAR.

A memorial to Tennant, sculpted by Allan G. Wyon, was erected in Salisbury Cathedral. There are two inscriptions on the memorial, one above the low-relief portrait of Tennant, and one below.

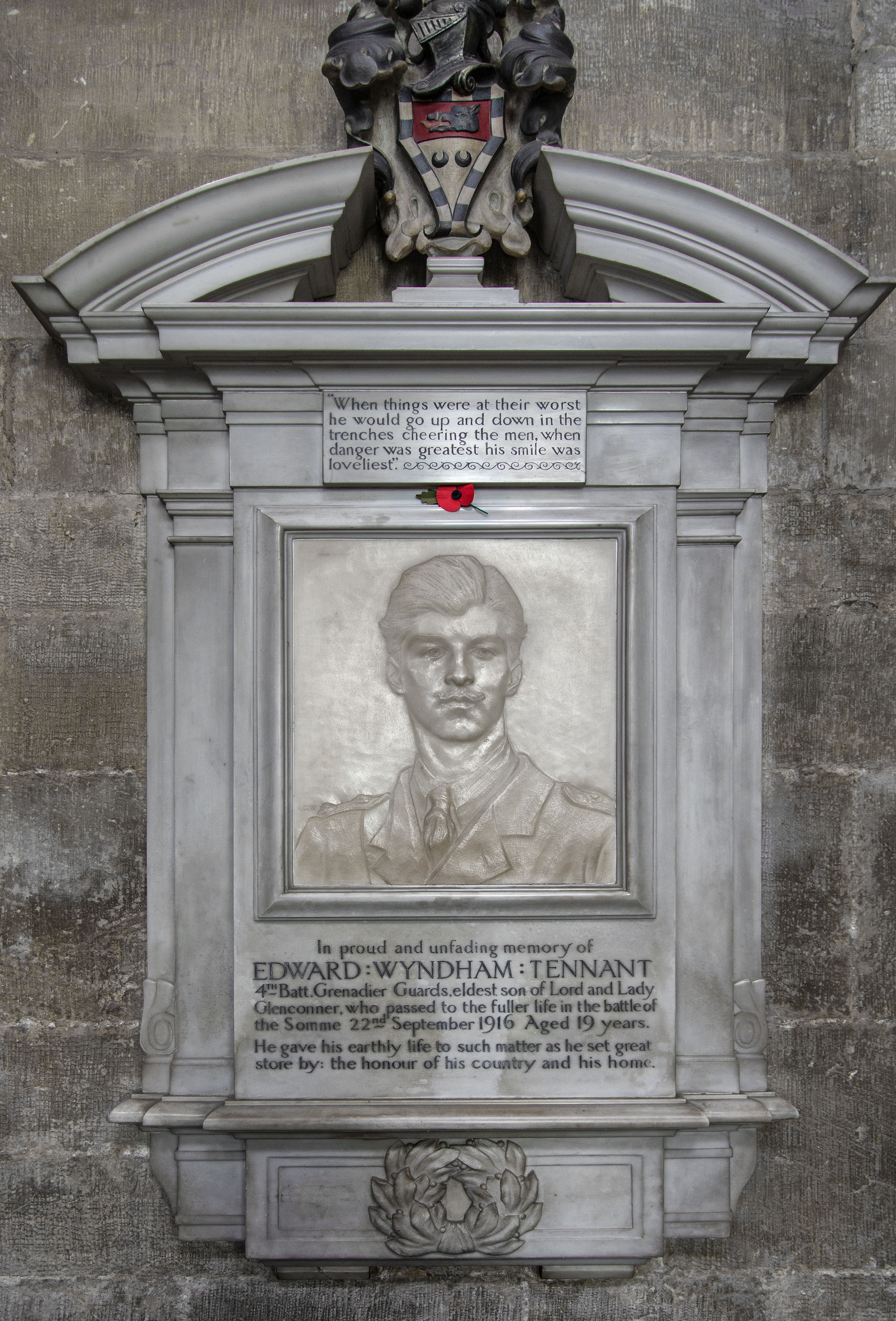
Memorial at Salisbury Cathedral

The upper inscription reads: "When things were at their worst he would go up and down in the trenches cheering the men, when danger was greatest his smile was loveliest."

The inscription below the portrait has the following wording:

In proud and unfading memory of
EDWARD WYNDHAM TENNANT
4th Batt. Grenadier Guards, eldest son of Lord and Lady
Glenconner, who passed to the fuller life in the battle of
the Somme 22nd September 1916 Aged 19 years.
He gave his earthly life to such matter as he set great
store by: the honour of his country and his home.

== Works ==
- Verses by A Child (private printing, 1909)
- Worple Flit and other poems (printed posthumously, 1916)
