= Stella Tennant =

British model and fashion designer (1970–2020)

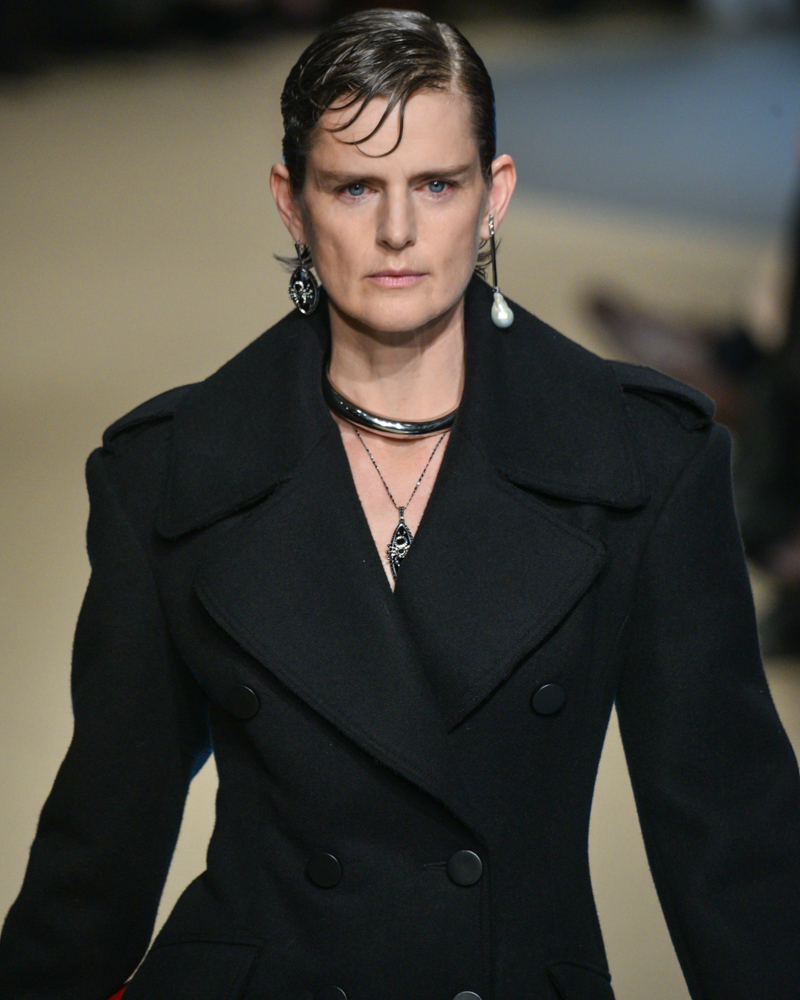
- Stella Tennant in 2018
- Born: 17 December 1970; London, England
- Died: 22 December 2020 (aged 50); Duns, Scottish Borders, Scotland
- Occupations: Model; fashion designer
- Years active: 1993–2020
- Spouse: David Lasnet (m. 1999; sep. 2020)
- Children: 4
- Parents: Hon. Tobias Tennant (father); Lady Emma Cavendish (mother)
- Modelling information
- Height: 5 ft 11 in (1.80 m)
- Hair colour: Brown
- Eye colour: Blue
- Agency: DNA Model Management (New York); VIVA Model Management (Paris, London, Barcelona); Mega Model Agency (Hamburg)

Stella Tennant (17 December 1970 – 22 December 2020) was a British model and designer who rose to fame in the early 1990s and had a career that spanned almost 30 years.

== Early life ==
Stella Tennant was born on 17 December 1970 in London, England, the youngest of three children of Hon. Tobias Tennant (b. 1941), son of Christopher Tennant, 2nd Baron Glenconner, and his wife, Lady Emma Cavendish (b. 1943).

She was a granddaughter of Andrew Cavendish, 11th Duke of Devonshire and his wife Deborah Mitford, the youngest of the Mitford sisters. Stella was a great-niece of the flamboyant socialite Stephen Tennant, of war poet Edward Tennant, and of William Cavendish, Marquess of Hartington, who married Kathleen "Kick" Kennedy, younger sister of U.S. President John F. Kennedy. She was also directly descended from Bess of Hardwick, a notable figure of Elizabethan English society, and a fourth cousin-once-removed to Diana, Princess of Wales.

Raised on a 1,500-acre (6 km^{2}) sheep farm that her parents ran at Newcastleton, in the Scottish Borders, Tennant went to the local primary school and then attended St Leonards School in St Andrews followed by Marlborough College before completing a degree in sculpture at the Winchester School of Art.

== Career ==
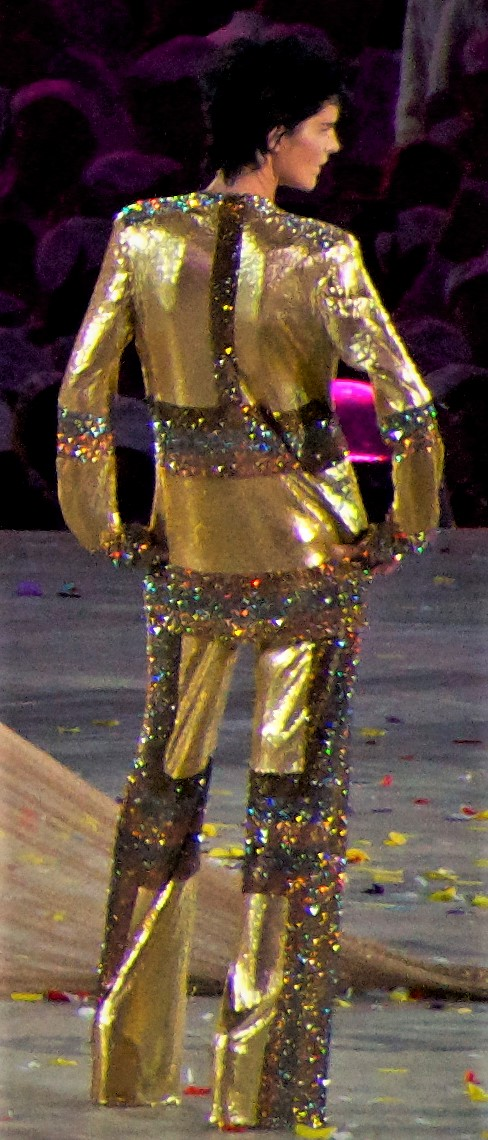
Tennant at the 2012 Summer Olympics closing ceremony

In 1993, Tennant sent photographs of herself to a fashion magazine, and a friend introduced her to fashion writer Plum Sykes. She had recently had her nose pierced, which was an unusual look for models at the time. Steven Meisel then photographed her for the 30th anniversary cover (October 1994) of Vogue Italia, alongside various models and celebrities. Soon after, Karl Lagerfeld announced Tennant as the new face of Chanel, with an exclusive contract. He is reported to have thought that she was reminiscent of Coco Chanel. Tennant then featured on the cover of i-D, W, D la Repubblica, Vogue Deutsch, L'Officiel, German Marie Claire, and Flare.

Tennant modelled frequently for influential fashion photographers including Mario Testino, Helmut Lang, David Sims, Steven Meisel, Bruce Weber, Paolo Roversi, Tim Walker and Mark Borthwick. Along with Kate Moss and Erin O'Connor, she was credited with having "introduced an era of androgyny on the catwalk".

Tennant appeared in the fashion shows of Bill Blass, Christian Dior, Shiatzy Chen and Chanel. She was a muse for Lagerfeld, Gianni Versace, Alexander McQueen, Nicolas Ghesquière, Riccardo Tisci and Victoria Beckham. She also appeared in numerous other advertising campaigns, including those of Marc Jacobs, Calvin Klein, Hermès, and in an influential 2002 campaign for Burberry. In 2010, she starred in L.K.Bennett's Spring Summer campaign photographed by Tim Walker. During the Closing Ceremony of the 2012 London Olympics, Tennant, along with Naomi Campbell and Kate Moss, was one of the British models wearing fashions created by British designers specifically for the event.

In 2016, Tennant and Lady Isabella Cawdor premiered a new ready to wear collection they designed for the gunmaker and clothing retailer Holland & Holland. She also ran Tennant & Son, which produced hand-knitted cashmeres and, with her sister Issy, Tennant & Tennant, which produced luxury homeware.

== Personal life and death ==
Tennant married French photographer and osteopath David Lasnet in the village of Oxnam, Roxburghshire, on 22 June 1999. They had four children. The family lived near Duns, in the small village of Edrom in Berwickshire, also in the Scottish Borders. In August 2020, Tennant and Lasnet announced they had separated.

Tennant died on 22 December 2020 shortly after her 50th birthday. Her family announced the following month that she had died by suicide after being unwell for a prolonged period.

== Activism ==
In 2009, Tennant worked with green lifestyle organisation Global Cool to promote using less energy at home. She made a video and became one of the faces of its campaign "Turn Up the Style, Turn Down the Heat". She also supported initiatives aimed at reducing fashion's effect on the environment, including Oxfam's "Second Hand September".

In August 2014, Tennant was one of 200 celebrities who signed a letter to The Guardian expressing their hope that Scotland would vote to remain part of the United Kingdom in the referendum on that issue.

== Honours and awards ==
Tennant won VH1/Vogue Model of the Year Award in 2001, Model of the Year at the 2011 British Fashion Awards, and the Contribution to British Fashion award at the Harper's Bazaar Women of the Year 2016 awards. In 2012, she was inducted into the Scottish Fashion Awards Hall of Fame.
