= The Glen, Scottish Borders =

Estate and country house in Scotland

The Glen
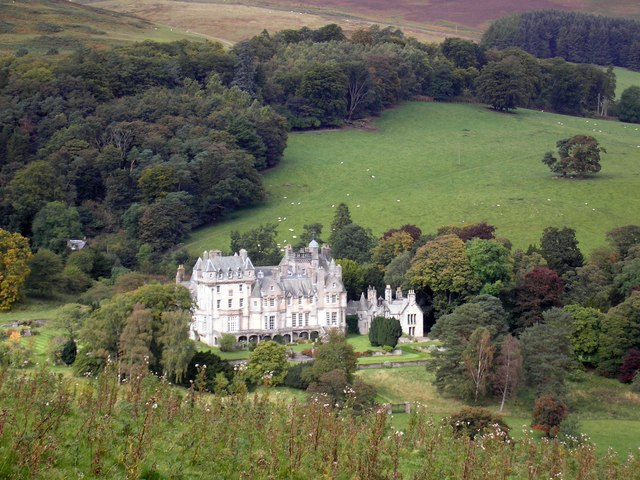
- The Glen viewed from the hills to the south-east

- Location in the Scottish Borders
- 55.5858°N 3.1153°W

Listed Building – Category A
- Designated: 23 February 1971
- Reference no.: LB19746

Inventory of Gardens and Designed Landscapes in Scotland
- Official name: The Glen
- Designated: 1 July 1987
- Reference no.: GDL00359

The Glen, also known as Glen House, is an estate and country house in the parish of Traquair, southern Scotland. It is located in the glen of the Quair Water, around 3 miles (4.8 km) south-west of Innerleithen, and 6 miles (9.7 km) south-east of Peebles, in the Scottish Borders. The estate is recorded from the 13th century, however the present Glen House was built in the mid-19th century. The house is protected as a category A listed building, and the grounds are included in the Inventory of Gardens and Designed Landscapes in Scotland, the national listing of significant gardens. Besides the house, the Temple, stables, and the "Lion Gate" are also category A listed.

== History ==
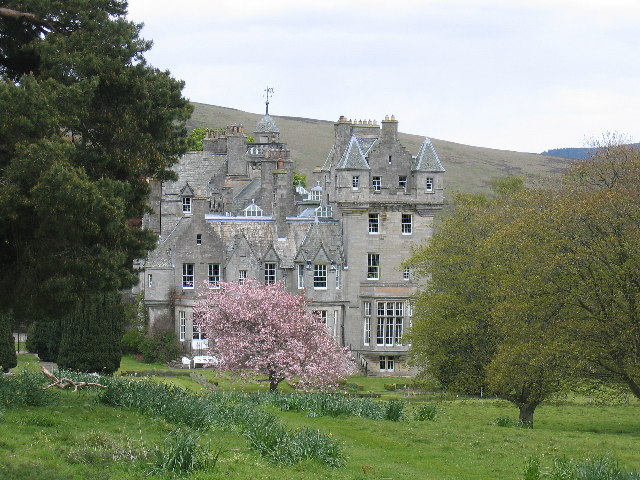

In 1296, it is recorded that Sarra of the Glen swore allegiance to King Edward I of England. The estate was later split up, and comprised the two estates of Easter Glen and Wester Glen by the 18th century. It was reunited under the ownership of Edinburgh banker Alexander Allan in 1796, who purchased Easter Glen in that year for £10,500. His son William Allan of Glen, Lord Provost of Edinburgh from 1829 to 1831, commissioned William Henry Playfair to extend the existing farmhouse. The first parklands were laid out at this time, with drainage and planting carried out around the house, and a garden temple, designed by Playfair, was built.

In 1852, The Glen was purchased, along with 3,500 acres (1,400 ha), by the industrialist Charles Tennant (1823–1906). Tennant commissioned David Bryce to design a new house, which was built in the Scottish Baronial style between 1854 and 1855. Bryce was commissioned to add a tower to the house in 1874. Tennant also carried out improvements in the parks until the 1890s, adding farm buildings, a kitchen garden, estate cottages and a school.

Tennant sat in Parliament from 1879 to 1885, in which year he was made a baronet. His family became prominent members of late Victorian and Edwardian society, and The Glen was regularly used by shooting parties. In 1894, his daughter Margot married the future Prime Minister H. H. Asquith. On Sir Charles's death in 1906 the estate passed to his son Edward (1859–1920), who was created Baron Glenconner in 1911.

Following a fire at The Glen in 1905, Robert Lorimer was commissioned to oversee repairs and remodelling of the interior. Formal gardens were also added at this time, to Lorimer's design. Further interior decoration was carried out by family friend Syrie Maugham in the 1920s. Another family friend, Princess Margaret, the Queen Elizabeth II's sister, visited The Glen on several occasions.

The Glen remains in the possession of the Tennant family, and is leased out for film shoots and conferences and has hosted seminars and other events on green finance and sustainability issues.
