= Goschen =

Goschen or Göschen is a surname of German origin. It may refer to:

== People ==
- Arthur Goschen (1880–1975), British Army officer
- Sir Edward Goschen, 1st Baronet (1847–1924), British diplomat
- Georg Joachim Göschen (1752–1828), German printer
- George Goschen, 1st Viscount Goschen (1831–1907), British banker and politician
- George Goschen, 2nd Viscount Goschen (1866–1952), British politician
- Giles Goschen, 4th Viscount Goschen (born 1965), British politician
- Johann Friedrich Ludwig Göschen (1778–1837), German jurist
- John Goschen, 3rd Viscount Goschen (1906–1977), British politician
- Oskar Göschen (1824–1900), German herald
- Otto Göschen (1808–1865), German legal scholar

== Other ==
- Viscount Goschen
- Goschen baronets
- Goschen formula
- Goschen, Victoria, locality in Australia
- Goschen, Lieberose, locality in Germany

== See also ==
- Goshen
