= Goshen =

The land of Goshen is the Hebrew name of an area in the Nile delta in Ancient Egypt.

Goshen may also refer to:

== Places ==
=== United States ===
==== Cities and towns ====
- Goshen, Alabama
- Goshen, Arkansas
- Goshen, California
- Goshen, Connecticut
- Goshen, Georgia
- Goshen, Idaho
- Goshen, Indiana
  - Goshen College, a Mennonite college
- Goshen, Kentucky
- Goshen, Massachusetts
- Goshen, Missouri
- Goshen, New Hampshire
- Goshen, New Jersey
- Goshen, New York, a town
  - Goshen (village), New York, in the town of Goshen
- Goshen, Ohio, in Clermont County
- Goshen, Tuscarawas County, Ohio
- Goshen, Oregon
- Goshen, Texas (disambiguation), multiple uses
- Goshen, Utah
  - Goshen Reservoir
  - Goshen Valley
- Goshen, Vermont
- Goshen, Virginia
  - Goshen Scout Reservation, a Boy Scout reservation
- Goshen, Washington
- Goshen, West Virginia

==== Other places ====
- Goshen Avenue, a street in Visalia, California
- Goshen County, Wyoming
- Goshen Road, an early road across Illinois
- Goshen Settlement, a historical area in Illinois
- Goshen Township (disambiguation)

=== Elsewhere ===
- Goshen, Tasmania, Australia, a locality
- Goshen, Nova Scotia, Canada, a rural community
- Goshen, Ontario, Canada, a rural community
- State of Goshen, South Africa, a short-lived Boer republic
- Goshen, New Brunswick Canada, a rural community in Albert County, Maritime Provinces, Eastern Canada, Atlantic Canada.

== Other uses ==
- Goshen Coach, a small bus manufacturer in Elkhart, Indiana

== See also ==
- Goshen point, a Paleo-Indian projectile point
- Goschen (disambiguation)
