= Edward Goschen =

Edward Goschen may refer to:

- Sir Edward Goschen, 1st Baronet (1847–1924), a British diplomat
- Sir Edward Goschen, 2nd Baronet (1876–1933), his son, also a British diplomat
