= Viscount Goschen =

Title in the Peerage of the United Kingdom

- Argent, a heart gules, flamant and transfixed by an arrow bendwise, point upwards proper, two anchors erect in chief sable
- Creation date: 18 December 1900
- Created by: Queen Victoria
- Peerage: Peerage of the United Kingdom
- First holder: George Goschen
- Present holder: Giles Goschen, 4th Viscount Goschen
- Heir apparent: Hon. Alexander Goschen
- Remainder to: Heirs male of the first viscount's body lawfully begotten
- Seats: Hilton House, Berkshire
- Motto: Pacem ("For Peace")

Viscount Goschen, of Hawkhurst in the County of Kent, is a title in the Peerage of the United Kingdom. It was created in 1900 for the politician George Goschen.

== History ==
The Goschen family descended from prominent publisher and printer Georg Joachim Göschen of Leipzig, Kingdom of Saxony. His third son, Wilhelm Heinrich (William Henry) Göschen (1793–1866), came to England in 1814 and the next year co-founded the merchant banking firm "Frühling & Göschen", of Leipzig and London.

Wilhelm's eldest son George joined the family firm before he entered politics. He served variously as Member of Parliament, Vice-President of the Board of Trade, Chancellor of the Duchy of Lancaster, President of the Poor Law Board, Chancellor of the Exchequer and First Lord of the Admiralty. He was raised to the peerage in December 1900 by Queen Victoria.

George's son, the second Viscount, sat as a Conservative Member of Parliament for East Grinstead and served as Governor of Madras. The second Viscount's only son, Lieutenant George Joachim Goschen (1893–1916), was killed during the First World War, dying of wounds received during the Siege of Kut. Upon the second Viscount's death in 1952, the title was inherited by his nephew John Goschen, the second son of his brother, Sir William Henry Goschen (1870–1943). Sir William's eldest son, Brig.-Gen. William Henry Goschen (1900–1944), was killed in action in Burma in the Second World War. The third Viscount served as Captain of the Yeomen of the Guard (Deputy Chief Whip in the House of Lords) in the Conservative administrations of Harold Macmillan, Sir Alec Douglas-Home and Edward Heath. As of 2017, the title is held by the fourth Viscount, who succeeded in 1977. He held junior ministerial positions in the Conservative government of John Major and is now one of the 90 elected hereditary peers that remain in the House of Lords after the passing of the House of Lords Act 1999.

The diplomat Sir Edward Goschen, 1st Baronet, was the younger brother of the first Viscount.

The family seat is Hilton House, near Crowthorne, Berkshire.

== Viscounts Goschen (1900) ==
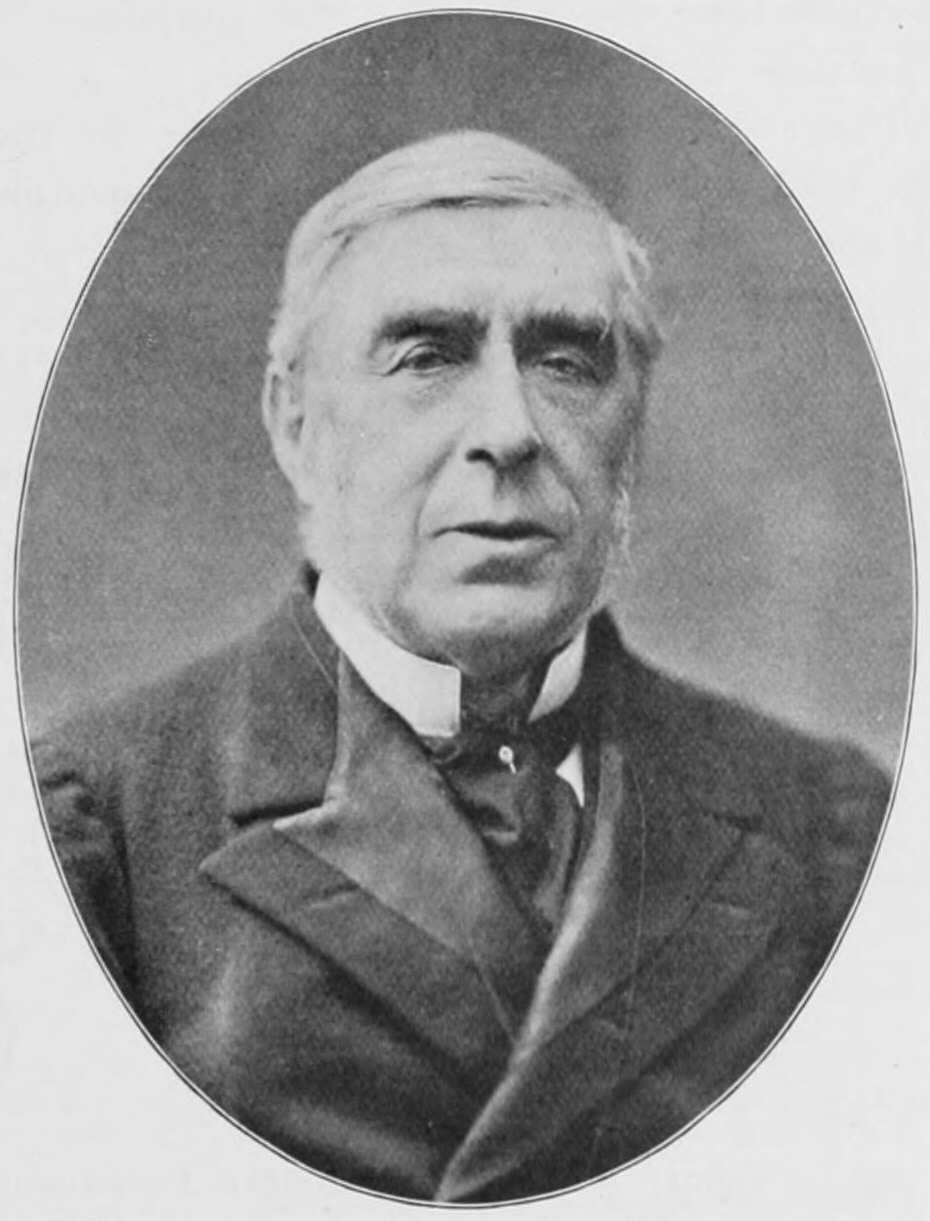
George Goschen, 1st Viscount Goschen.

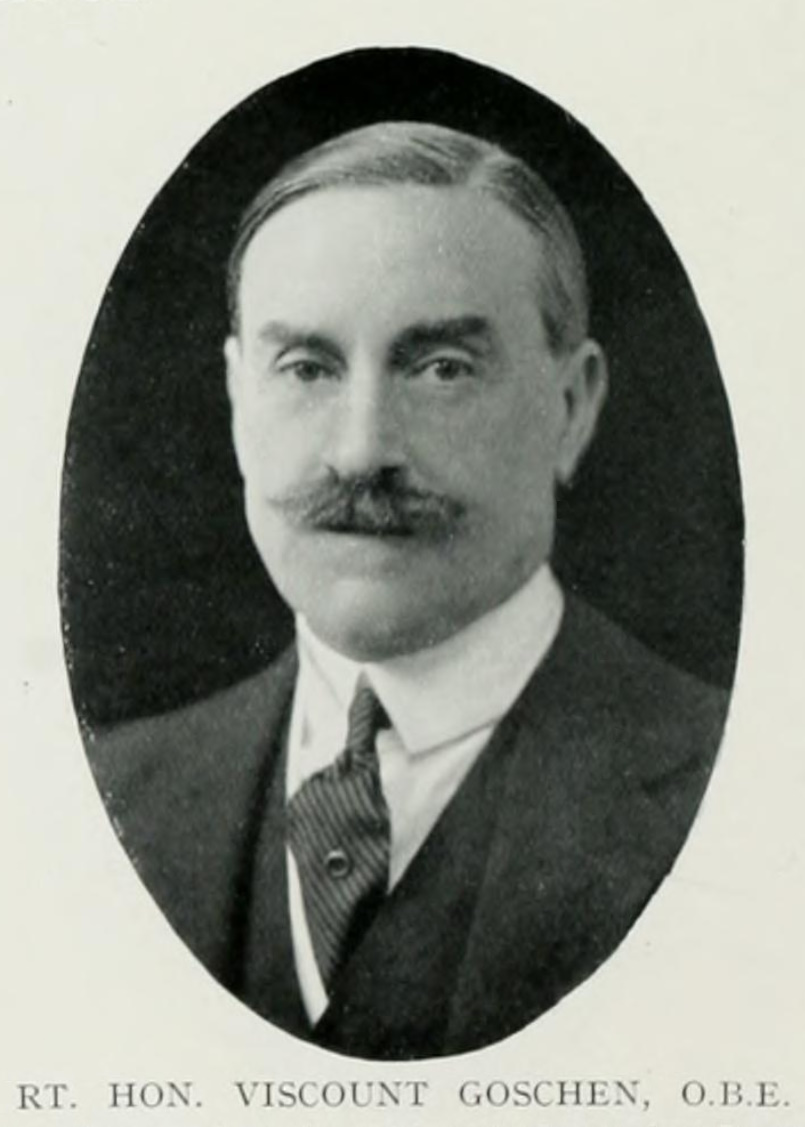
George Goschen, 2nd Viscount Goschen.

- George Joachim Goschen, 1st Viscount Goschen (1831–1907)
- George Joachim Goschen, 2nd Viscount Goschen (1866–1952), son of the first Viscount
- John Alexander Goschen, 3rd Viscount Goschen (1906–1977), nephew of the second Viscount
- Giles John Harry Goschen, 4th Viscount Goschen (born 1965), son of the third Viscount

The heir apparent is the present holder's son, the Hon. Alexander John Edward Goschen (born 2001).

=== Title succession chart ===
Title succession chart, Viscounts Goschen and Goschen baronets (both creations)

Wilhelm Heinrich (William Henry) Goschen; 1793–1866
Viscount Goschen	Goschen baronetcy of Beacon Lodge
George Joachim Goschen; 1831–1907; 1st Viscount Goschen	Henry Goschen; 1837–1932	William Edward Goschen; 1847–1924; 1st Baronet
Goschen baronetcy of Durrington House
George Joachim Goschen; 1866–1952; 2nd Viscount Goschen	William Goschen; 1870–1943	Harry Goschen; 1865–1945; Baronet	Edward Henry Goschen; 1876–1933; 2nd Baronet	George Goschen; 1887–1953
Baronetcy extinct
George Goschen; 1893–1916	Brig. Gen. William Goschen; 1900–1944	John Alexander Goschen; 1906–1977; 3rd Viscount Goschen	Edward Goschen; 1913–2001; 3rd Baronet	Alexander Goschen; 1915–1975	David Goschen; 1931–1980
Giles John Harry Goschen b. 1965; 4th Viscount Goschen	Alexander Goschen b. 1949; 4th Baronet	Sebastian Goschen b. 1959
Alexander Goschen b. 2001

== Heraldic achievement ==
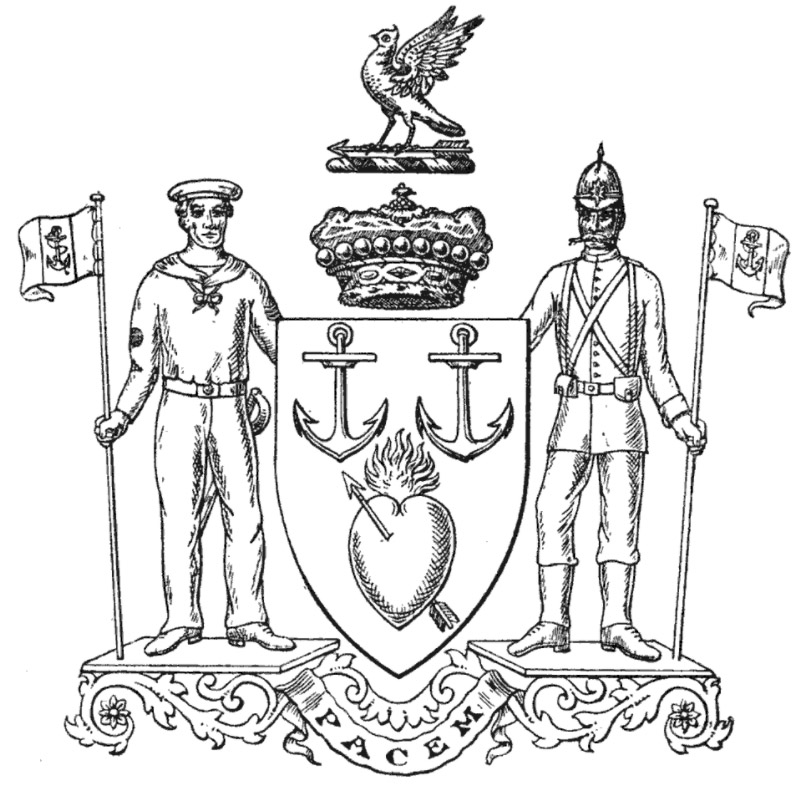
Heraldic achievement of the Viscounts Goschen

== See also ==
- Goschen baronets
