= William Pye =

William Pye may refer to:

- William S. Pye (1880–1959), US Navy admiral
- William George Pye (1869–1949), English businessman
- William Pye (priest) (died 1557), English priest
- William Pye (sculptor) (born 1938), British sculptor

== See also ==
- William Pye Baddeley
