= Dugald Stewart (disambiguation) =

Dugald Stewart was a Scottish philosopher and mathematician.

Dugald Stewart may also refer to:

- Dugald Stewart (Canadian politician), Canadian physician and politician
- Dugald Stewart (Vermont politician), Vermont state auditor
- Sir Dugald Stewart (diplomat), British diplomat
- Dugald Stewart, Lord Blairhall, Scottish judge and politician
