= Hugh Wyndham =

Hugh Wyndham may refer to:

- Sir Hugh Wyndham (judge) (1602–1684), English judge of the Common Pleas and Baron of the Exchequer
- Hugh Wyndham (Minehead MP) (c. 1624–71), MP for Minehead 1661–71
- Sir Hugh Wyndham (diplomat) (1836–1916), British diplomat, minister to Serbia, Brazil and Romania
- Hugh Wyndham, 4th Baron Leconfield (1877–1963), British peer, politician and author
