= Joseph Sebag-Montefiore =

British banker, stockbroker and politician

Sir Joseph Sebag-Montefiore
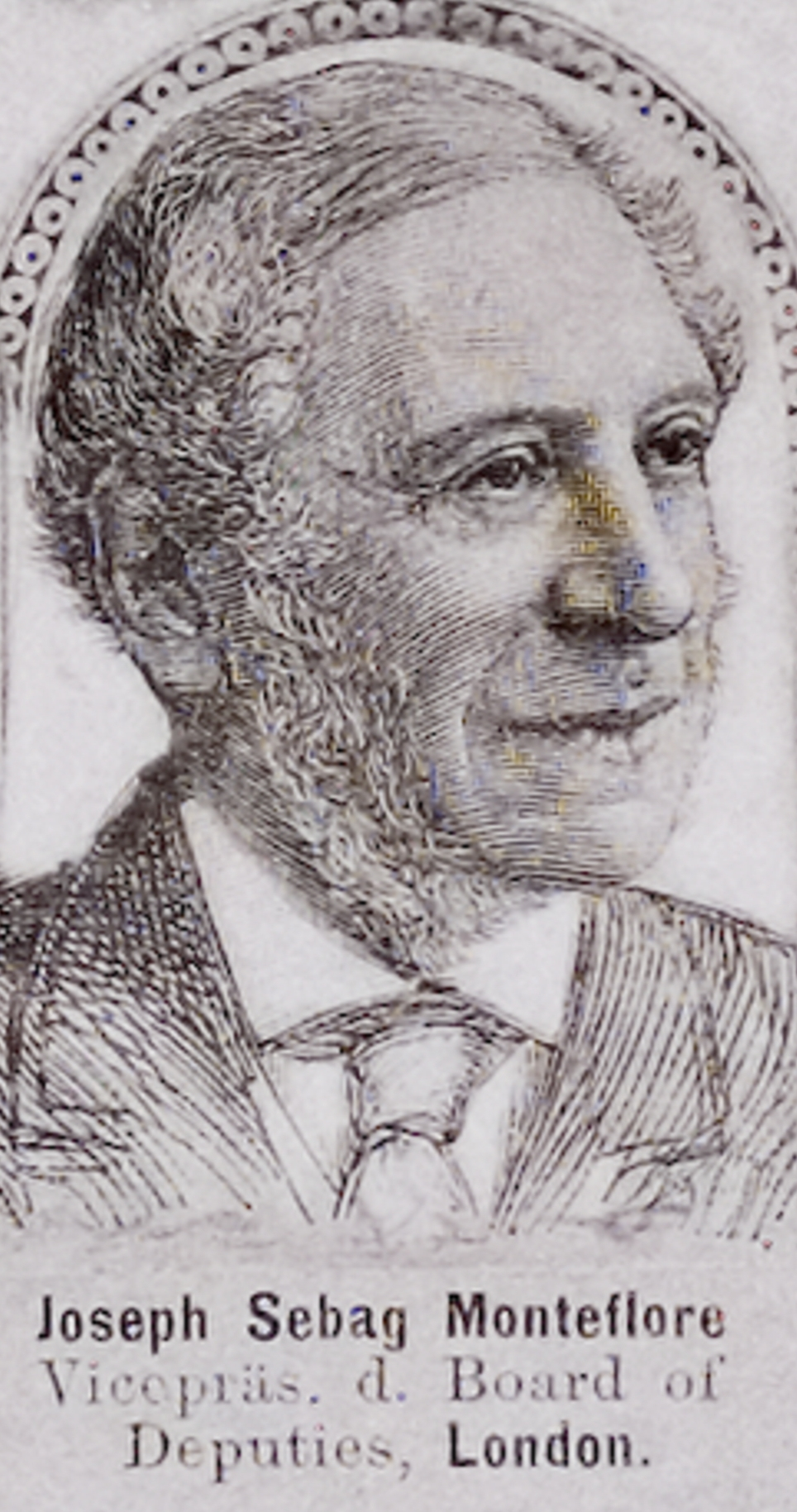
- Born: Joseph Sebag; 29 August 1822; London, United Kingdom
- Died: 18 January 1903 (aged 80); London
- Occupations: Banker, stockbroker, politician
- Known for: Representative of the English Jewish community

Sir Joseph Sebag-Montefiore (29 August 1822 – 18 January 1903) was a British banker, stockbroker and politician.

== Life ==
Sebag-Montefiore was the son of Solomon Sebag and his wife Sarah Montefiore. He was the nephew and heir of Moses Montefiore.

On 29 August 1885 his surname was supplemented with royal permission with that of his mother's family as Sebag-Montefiore.

== Career ==
Sebag-Montefiore was a prominent figure in the City of London and founded the stockbroking firm of Joseph Sebag & Company.

He held a number of public offices, including Justice of the Peace (J.P.) for Kent and for the Cinque Ports, Lieutenant of the City of London, and High Sheriff of Kent. For a long time he was the officially recognized representative of the English Jewish community. Amongst other positions he held, he was, from 1894 to 1902, the President of the Municipal Council of Spanish-Portuguese Jews in London. After the accession of King Edward VII in 1901, Sebag-Montefiore headed the deputation of the representatives of the Anglo-Jewish institutions visiting him to congratulate.

He was knighted in 1896.

He was also Consul-General for Italy in London from 1896 to 1903, and was a Companion of the Order of the Crown of Italy.

Sebag-Montefiore died at 4, Hyde Park Gardens, London, on 18 January 1903.

== Family ==
Sebag married in June 1851 Adelaide Cohen, daughter of Louis Cohen and Rebecca Floretta Keyser. She died in 1895. They had six children. His eldest son, Arthur Sebag-Montefiore (1853–1895), had predeceased him and his estate passed to Arthur′s widow, Henriette Hannah née Beddington (1859–1924) and their eldest son, Robert Sebag-Montefiore (1882–1915). The writer Simon Sebag Montefiore is a descendant of Joseph′s youngest son, Major Cecil Sebag-Montefiore (1873–1923).
