= Sir Horace Rumbold, 9th Baronet =

British diplomat (1869–1941)

The Right Honourable Sir Horace Rumbold Bt GCB GCMG KCVO
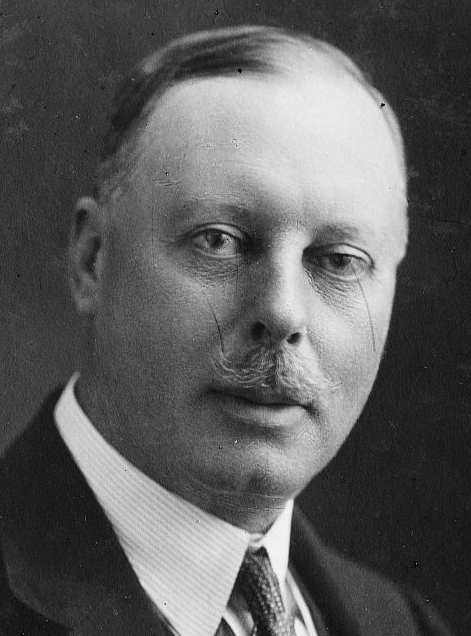
- Sir Horace Rumbold, Bt.

British Ambassador to Germany
- In office 1928–1933
- Monarch: George V
- Preceded by: Sir Ronald Lindsay
- Succeeded by: Sir Eric Phipps

Personal details
- Born: 5 February 1869 St. Petersburg, Russian Empire
- Died: 24 May 1941 (aged 72) Tisbury, Wiltshire

Sir Horace George Montagu Rumbold, 9th Baronet, GCB, GCMG, KCVO, PC (5 February 1869 – 24 May 1941) was a British diplomat. A well-travelled man who learned Arabic, Japanese and German, he is largely remembered for his role as British Ambassador to Berlin from 1928 to 1933 in which he warned of the ambitions of Hitler and Nazi Germany.

== Background and education ==
Rumbold was born on 5 February 1869 at St. Petersburg in the Russian Empire, the son of Sir Horace Rumbold, 8th Baronet and Caroline Barney (née Harrington). Horace was educated at Aldin House Prep School and at Eton.

== Career ==
Rumbold was an honorary attaché at The Hague (1889–1890), where his father was ambassador. In 1891, he passed the first of the required examinations and entered the Diplomatic Service.

After a year at the Foreign Office in London, he served in Cairo, Tehran, Vienna, Madrid and Munich between 1900 and 1913. He was then moved to Tokyo (1909–1913) and to Berlin (1913–1914). In Berlin, he took up the position of counsellor. Rumbold was in charge of the British Embassy when the ambassador, Sir Edward Goschen, went home on leave on 1 July. Rumbold conducted negotiations in the first four of the ten days that preceded the outbreak of the First World War. Rumbold left Berlin with the ambassador on 5 August 1914, with crowds attacking the embassy and their train.

In 1916, he was appointed ambassador to Berne. After the war, he was appointed ambassador to Poland in 1919, The following year, he became the High Commissioner to Constantinople during which he signed the Lausanne Treaty on behalf of the British Empire. He then became ambassador to Madrid from 1924 to 1928.

Rumbold was appointed to his last position as ambassador to Berlin in 1928. He supported appeasing Heinrich Brüning's government in the hope of staving off German nationalist parties such as Adolf Hitler's Nazi Party. Once Hitler came to power in 1933, Rumbold was deeply unsettled by the Nazi regime and produced a succession of despatches critical of the Nazis. On 26 April 1933 Rumbold sent to the Foreign Office his valedictory despatch in which he gave an unvarnished view of Hitler, the Nazis and their ambitions:

[Hitler] starts with the assumption that man is a fighting animal; therefore the nation is a fighting unit, being a community of fighters.... A country or race which ceases to fight is doomed.... Pacifism is the deadliest sin.... Intelligence is of secondary importance.... Will and determination are of the higher worth. Only brute force can ensure survival of the race. The new Reich must gather within its fold all the scattered German elements in Europe.... What Germany needs is an increase in territory... [to Hitler] the idea that there is something reprehensible in chauvinism is entirely mistaken... the climax of education is military service [for youths] educated to the maximum of aggressiveness.... It is the duty of the government to implant in the people feeling of manly courage and passionate hatred.... Intellectualism is undesirable...It is objectionable to preach international understanding... [he] has spoken with derision of such delusive documents as peace-pacts and such delusive ideas as the spirit of Locarno.

Rumbold concluded by giving stark warnings for the future of international relations:

...it would be misleading to base any hopes on a return to sanity...[the German government is encouraging an attitude of mind]...which can only end in one way.... I have the impression that the persons directing the policy of the Hitler government are not normal.

Sir John Simon, the Foreign Secretary, found Rumbold's descriptions to be "definitely disquieting". Ralph Wigram, an official in the Foreign Office, gave Winston Churchill a copy of this despatch in the middle of March 1936. After Rumbold's death, Lord Vansittart said of him that "little escaped him, and his warnings [about Nazi Germany] were clearer than anything that we got later". Walter Laqueur concurred by claiming that Rumbold's "prophetic" insights explained the Third Reich better than the expert opinions that were later issued from the OSS.

== Honours ==
Rumbold was made a Member of the Royal Victorian Order (MVO) in 1907, a Knight Commander of the Order of St Michael and St George in 1917, sworn of the Privy Council in 1920 and appointed a Knight Grand Cross of the Order of St Michael and St George (GCMG) in 1922.

== Personal life ==
Rumbold married Etheldred Constantia Fane, younger daughter of the British diplomat Sir Edmund Douglas Veitch Fane (1837–1900) (Note: Sir Edmund Fane was of the landed gentry, since his mother was an heiress. His father Rev. Arthur Fane had more socially questionable antecedents, as the younger surviving illegitimate son of General Sir Henry Fane (d. 1840), a prominent army officer, himself grandson of an earl of Westmorland. The illegitimate branch retained connections to their legitimate relatives; Arthur Fane served as chaplain to his cousin the earl.) by his wife Constantia Wood, (Note: Her father Lt-General Robert Blucher Wood, of a prominent and well-married landed gentry family, was nephew of the 3rd Marquess of Londonderry and half-nephew of the statesman Viscount Castlereagh. His godfather was the Prussian field marshal Blucher, a contemporary of the Duke of Wellington) a niece of the 3rd Earl of Lonsdale, on 18 July 1905.

On his father's death in November 1913, Horace succeeded him as 9th baronet.

They had one son and two daughters; the younger daughter died young in 1918. Lady Rumbold's only brother Henry Nevile Fane was married in 1910 (divorced 1935) to the elder daughter of the 21st Baron Clinton, and the Rumbolds were thus indirectly related to the British royal family after 1923. (Note: Harriet Fane's younger sister Fenella was married to a brother of Lady Elizabeth Bowes-Lyon who in 1923 married the future George VI, then the Duke of York.)

Rumbold retired due to his age in June 1933, though he later served on the Peel Commission for Palestine. He died on 24 May 1941, aged 72, at his home in Tisbury, Wiltshire. He was succeeded in the baronetcy by his son, Anthony, who also became a distinguished diplomat.

== Bibliography ==
- The War Crisis in Berlin: July to August 1914 by Horace Rumbold (London, 1944).

== Notes ==
Diplomatic posts
Preceded by Sir Evelyn Grant Duff	British Ambassador to Switzerland; 1916–1919	Succeeded by Odo Russell
New office	British Ambassador to Poland; 1919–1920	Succeeded by William Müller
Preceded by Sir John de Robeck	British High Commissioner at Constantinople; 1920–1923	Succeeded by himself as Ambassador to Turkey
Preceded by himself as High Commissioner	British Ambassador to Turkey; 1923–1924	Succeeded by Sir Ronald Lindsay
Preceded by Sir Esme Howard	British Ambassador to Spain; 1924–1928	Succeeded by George Dixon Grahame
Preceded by Sir Ronald Lindsay	British Ambassador to Germany; 1928–1933	Succeeded by Sir Eric Phipps
Baronetage of Great Britain
Preceded by Horace Rumbold	Baronet (of Woodhall); 1913–1941	Succeeded by Anthony Rumbold
