= Frederick St John =

Frederick St John may refer to:

- Frederick St John, 2nd Viscount Bolingbroke (1732–1787), British peer and courtier
- Frederick Robert St John (1831–1923), British Envoy to Venezuela, Serbia and Switzerland
- Frederick St John (British Army officer) (1765–1844), general, MP for Oxford
