= Goshen, Texas =

Goshen can refer to:

- Goshen, Henderson County, Texas
- Goshen, Parker County, Texas
- Goshen, Walker County, Texas
- Goshen Creek in Parker County, Texas
