= Michael Stewart (diplomat) =

British diplomat (1911–1994)

Sir Michael Stewart KCMG OBE

British Ambassador to Greece
- In office 1967–1971
- Preceded by: Sir Ralph Murray
- Succeeded by: Sir Robin Hooper

British Chargé d'Affaires to China
- In office 1959–1962
- Preceded by: Duncan Wilson
- Succeeded by: Terence Garvey

Personal details
- Born: 18 January 1911
- Died: 25 September 1994 (aged 83)
- Children: 3
- Education: Trinity College, Cambridge
- Occupation: Diplomat

Sir Michael Norman Francis Stewart (18 January 1911 – 25 September 1994) was a British diplomat who served as Ambassador to Greece from 1967 to 1971.

== Early life and education ==
Stewart was born on 18 January 1911, the son of Sir Francis Stewart, a wealthy businessman who served as High Sheriff of Calcutta, and Lady Frances Henrietta Stewart. He was educated at Shrewsbury School and Trinity College, Cambridge before he joined the Slade School of Art and then the Royal Academy School.

== Career ==
Stewart began his career as assistant keeper at the Victoria and Albert Museum where he worked from 1935 to 1939. After he was refused for military service on the outbreak of World War II due to his partial deafness, he joined the Ministry of Information and was employed as press attaché at the British Embassy in Lisbon from 1941 until 1944. He was then transferred to the British Embassy in Rome serving as first secretary (Information).

Stewart returned to London in 1948 and was employed at the Foreign Office. In 1951, he was appointed counsellor in intelligence services at the UK Commission for South-East Asia based in Singapore, remaining in the post until 1954. From 1954 to 1959 he served as counsellor in Ankara, and then chargé d’affaires in Peking between 1959 and 1962 at a time when China was unwilling to exchange ambassadors. From 1962 to 1964 he worked as a civilian instructor at the Imperial Defence College before he was appointed minister at the British Embassy in Washington, serving from 1964 to 1967.

In 1967 he was appointed Ambassador to Greece and arrived shortly after the military coup which established "the Regime of the Colonels". In handling a difficult situation, according to The Times, "While personally disapproving of the junta, he saw it as his primary duty to maintain a working relationship with the regime—a path he trod with considerable skill." He remained in the post until his retirement in 1971.

In retirement, Stewart was a director for five years of the Ditchley Foundation, and a director of Sotheby's.

== Personal life and death ==
Stewart married Katharine Damaris Houssemayne du Boulay, who was also a British diplomat, in 1951 and they had one son and two daughters.

Stewart died on 25 September 1994, aged 83.

== Honours ==
Stewart was appointed Companion of the Order of St Michael and St George (CMG) in the 1957 New Years Honours, and promoted to Knight Commander (KCMG) in the 1966 Birthday Honours. In the 1948 New Year Honours, he was appointed Officer of the Order of the British Empire (OBE).

== See also ==
Greece–United Kingdom relations

Diplomatic posts
Preceded by Duncan Wilson	British Chargé d'Affaires to China; 1959–1962	Succeeded by Terence Garvey
Preceded by Sir Ralph Murray	British Ambassador to Greece; 1967–1971	Succeeded by Sir Robin Hooper
