= Sir Anthony Rumbold, 10th Baronet =

British diplomat

Sir Anthony Rumbold, 10th Baronet KCMG KCVO CB (7 March 1911 – 4 December 1983) was a British diplomat, ambassador to Thailand and Austria.

== Early life ==
Horace Anthony Claude Rumbold, son of Sir Horace Rumbold, 9th Baronet, was educated at Eton College and Magdalen College, Oxford, and was for a short time a Fellow of Queen's College, Oxford, before joining the Diplomatic Service in 1935.

== Career ==
Rumbold began his career in the Foreign Office in London and was posted to Washington, D.C., in 1937. He returned to the Foreign Office in 1942 before being posted to Italy in 1944 to the staff of the Minister Resident at Allied Headquarters in the Mediterranean, Harold Macmillan. He moved to Prague in 1947, returned to the Foreign Office again in 1949 as head of the Southern Europe department with the rank of Counsellor, and was posted to Paris in 1951 with the same rank. In March 1954 he was appointed principal private secretary (PPS) to the Foreign Secretary, Anthony Eden. He accompanied Eden on several overseas visits including the Geneva Conference in May 1954, Eden and Winston Churchill's trip to Washington in June for talks with the Secretary of State (John Foster Dulles) and President Dwight D. Eisenhower, and a tour of European capitals in September 1954.

When Churchill resigned and Eden became Prime Minister in April 1955, Rumbold remained for a few months as PPS to the new Foreign Secretary, Harold Macmillan, accompanying him to San Francisco in June 1955 for talks between the Foreign Ministers of the United States, Britain, France and Russia in preparation for the Geneva Summit in the following month.

Rumbold left the Foreign Office for a time, then returned, and was an assistant Under-Secretary of State 1957–60, responsible for European and east–west relations. Again he accompanied the Foreign Secretary, now Selwyn Lloyd, in international talks including Eisenhower's visit to England in August 1959, and was British representative on working groups preparing for the frequent top-level conferences at that time, including the 1960 Paris Summit which failed because of the U-2 incident just before the summit took place.

In June 1960 Rumbold was appointed Minister in Paris (under the ambassador, Sir Pierson Dixon); The Times suggested that he could have been appointed as ambassador in a smaller mission if he had not chosen to remain on the "inner circuit" of major capitals. In 1965 he was appointed Ambassador to Thailand; while he was there he was also UK representative on the Council of SEATO. In 1967 he received his final appointment as Ambassador to Austria. He retired from the Diplomatic Service in 1970.

== Honours ==
Anthony Rumbold was appointed CMG in the 1953 Coronation Honours when he was Counsellor at the Embassy in Paris and CB in the Queen's Birthday Honours of 1955 for his work as PPS to the Foreign Secretary. He was knighted KCMG in the Queen's Birthday Honours of 1962 and KCVO in 1969. The Norwegian government made him Commander of the Order of St. Olav in 1955 and the Austrian government gave him the Grand Cross of the Order of Merit in 1969.

== Personal life ==
Anthony Rumbold inherited the Rumbold baronetcy on the death of his father, Sir Horace Rumbold, 9th Baronet, in 1941 (thus becoming Sir Anthony long before he would have acquired the title through knighthood). In 1937 he married Felicity Ann Bailey (whose maternal grandfather was the 1st Earl of Inchcape) at St Margaret's, Westminster. They had three daughters and one son, who inherited the baronetcy as Sir Henry Rumbold, 11th Baronet.

Anthony Rumbold's best man at his wedding was his friend and fellow-diplomat Donald Maclean who was much later revealed to be a Soviet spy, which led to suspicions that Rumbold might have been the so-called "Fifth Man" in the spy ring which included Maclean.

In 1974 Sir Anthony and Lady Rumbold were divorced, and he married Mrs Pauline Graham, whose first husband had been the anthropologist and ethnographer Julian Pitt-Rivers. They had no children; she died in 2008.

== Offices held ==
Diplomatic posts
Preceded by Evelyn Shuckburgh	Principal Private Secretary to the Secretary of State for Foreign Affairs; 1954–1955	Succeeded by Patrick Hancock
Preceded by Sir Dermot MacDermot	Ambassador Extraordinary and Plenipotentiary at Bangkok; 1965–1967	Succeeded by Sir Neil Pritchard
Preceded by Sir John Pilcher	Ambassador Extraordinary and Plenipotentiary at Vienna; 1967–1970	Succeeded by Sir Peter Wilkinson
Baronetage of Great Britain
Preceded by Horace Rumbold	Baronet (of Wood Hall); 1941–1983	Succeeded by Henry Rumbold
