= Cyril Wagstaff =

British Army general (1878–1934)

Major-General Cyril Wagstaff CB CMG CIE DSO
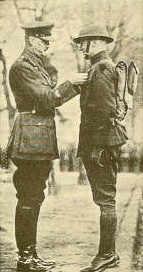
- Brigadier-General Cyril Wagstaff (left) confers the Military Cross upon American First Lieutenant George W. Sherwood of the 131st Infantry, 33rd Division, Larochette, 20 January 1919
- Born: 5 March 1878
- Died: 21 February 1934 (aged 55)
- Military career
- Allegiance: United Kingdom
- Branch: British Army
- Service years: 1897–1934
- Rank: Major-General
- Commands: Royal Military Academy, Woolwich
- Conflicts: First World War
- Awards: Companion of the Order of the Bath; Companion of the Order of St Michael and St George; Companion of the Order of the Indian Empire; Distinguished Service Order

Major-General Cyril Mosley Wagstaff CB CMG CIE DSO (5 March 1878 – 21 February 1934) was a British Army officer who became Commandant of the Royal Military Academy, Woolwich.

== Military career ==
Educated at the United Services College, Wagstaff was commissioned into the Royal Engineers in 1897.

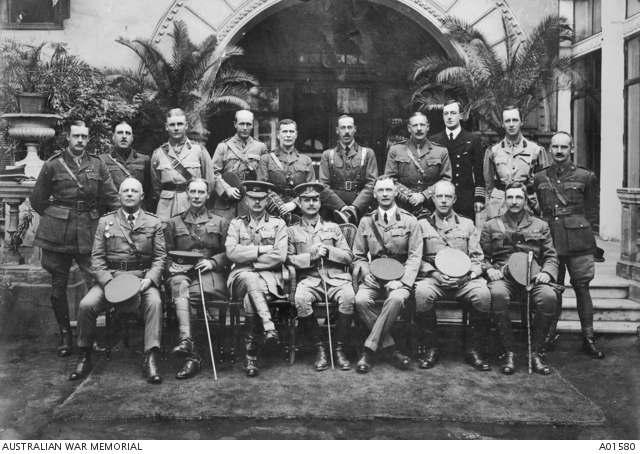
Group portrait of officers of the Australian and New Zealand Army Corps outside Shepheard's Hotel, Cairo, Egypt, March 1915. Stood on the extreme left is Major Cyril Wagstaff, then a GSO2.

He served on the North West Frontier of India and in the First World War with the Australian Army and is credited with creating the term ANZAC. He was promoted to temporary lieutenant colonel in October 1915, brevet lieutenant colonel in January 1917, and brevet colonel in June 1919.

He served as a brigadier general, general staff of Northern Command, India in October 1920. He was appointed a General Staff Officer at the War Office in 1925, Commander of the Nowshera Brigade on the North West Frontier of India in 1928 and promoted to major general in February 1931, was commandant of the Royal Military Academy Woolwich in 1930 before his death in 1934.

== Family ==
In 1906, he married Rosabel Thelwall. Following the death of his first wife, he married Marjorie Frances Fry in 1927.

Military offices
Preceded by Hugo de Pree	Commandant of the Royal Military Academy Woolwich; 1930–1934	Succeeded by Arthur Goschen
