= Julian Pitt-Rivers =

British social anthropologist, ethnographer and professor

- Born: 16 March 1919
- Died: 12 August 2001 (aged 82)
- Education: Eton College
- Alma mater: Worcester College, Oxford
- Occupation: Anthropologist
- Spouses: Pauline Tennant (m. 1946; div. 1953) Margarita Larios y Fernández de Villavicencio (m. 1955; div. 1971) Françoise Geoffroy (m. 1971)
- Parents: George Pitt-Rivers (father); Mary Hinton (mother)
- Relatives: Michael Pitt-Rivers (brother)

Julian Alfred Lane Fox Pitt-Rivers (16 March 1919 – 12 August 2001) was a British social anthropologist, an ethnographer, and a professor at universities in three countries.

== Family background ==
Pitt-Rivers was a great-grandson of the archaeologist Augustus Pitt Rivers. His father was the anthropologist and propertied aristocrat George Henry Lane-Fox Pitt-Rivers and his mother, Mary Hinton, was an actress and daughter of the governor-general of Australia, the 1st Baron Forster. His parents divorced in 1930, and through his father's second marriage (1931–1937) he gained as his stepmother Dr Rosalind Pitt-Rivers, an eminent biochemist. He had two brothers, one by each of his father's marriages. His elder brother Michael inherited their father's substantial estates, and in the 1950s was caught in a legal case which contributed to national debate. His younger half-brother Anthony was born in 1932. After the war, his father fell in love with Stella Lonsdale; she changed her name to his, but they never married. When George Pitt-Rivers died in 1966, he left much of his fortune to her.

== Education and scholarship ==
Julian Pitt-Rivers attended Eton College and Worcester College, Oxford. Through his work as an ethnographer of empathic considerations for cultural diversity, he rebelled against his father, a Mosleyite eugenicist who was interned by the British government in the early years of World War II.

Pitt-Rivers received his doctorate in 1953, which was derived from his fieldwork in Andalusia, Spain, that led to his publication of the classic anthropological text The People of the Sierra in 1954. The introduction was provided by his Oxford professor, E. E. Evans-Pritchard. He taught at the University of California, Berkeley and the University of Chicago. In addition, he taught at the London School of Economics and several universities in France, including the École Pratique des Hautes Études in Paris (now the École des Hautes Études en Sciences Sociales).

== Personal life ==
Pitt-Rivers was married three times. His first wife, whom he married on 17 August 1946, was Pauline Laetitia Tennant, daughter of actress Hermione Baddeley and aristocrat David Tennant. They divorced in 1953. In 1955, he married Margarita Larios y Fernández de Villavicencio, the former wife of Miguel, duke of Primo Rivera; they divorced in 1971. His third wife, whom he married in 1971, was Françoise Geoffroy, who survived him. He had no children. During his last years, he was affected by dementia that set in nearly five years before his death in 2001 and while he was still producing excellent work.

== Publications ==
- Pitt-Rivers, Julian. The fate of Shechem:or, The politics of sex: essays in the anthropology of the Mediterranean. Cambridge [Eng.]; New York: Cambridge University Press, 1977.
- Pitt-Rivers, Julian, Ed., Mediterranean countrymen;essays in the social anthropology of the Mediterranean, Paris: Mouton, 1963.
- Pitt-Rivers, Julian Alfred, The people of the Sierra. Introd. by E. E. Evans-Pritchard. New York: Criterion Books, 1954.
