= Edmund Fane =

British diplomat

Sir Edmund Douglas Veitch Fane KCMG, JP, DL (6 May 1837 – 20 March 1900) was a British diplomat.

== Early life and education ==
Fane was born in Boyton, Wiltshire, the eldest son of Rev. Arthur Fane (d. 1872) of Boyton, prebendary of Salisbury, by Lucy, daughter of John Benett of Pythouse, Wiltshire. His father was a descendant of Thomas Fane, 8th Earl of Westmorland. He matriculated at Merton College, Oxford on 28 May 1855, but did not graduate.

== Career ==
Having entered the diplomatic service, Fane was appointed in 1858 attaché at Tehran. In 1863, he was transferred to Turin, and from Turin in 1866 to St. Petersburg as second secretary.

In varied years 1867 to 1878, Fane had stays of brief duration at Washington, Florence, Munich, Brussels, Vienna, and Berne. He was secretary of legation at Copenhagen 1880–1, secretary of embassy at Madrid 1882–5, and at Constantinople 1886–93, and minister at Belgrade from 1893 until 1898. He negotiated the treaty of commerce with the Kingdom of Serbia of 10 July 1893. He was posted to Copenhagen as Minister in 1898, and served there for the last 18 months of his life. Though not among the most important diplomatic positions, the Copenhagen post was socially significant due to the close relationship (and many visits) between the royal families of the two countries.

In 1897, Fane received the Jubilee Medal, and in the 1899 New Year Honours was created a Knight Commander of the Order of St Michael and St George (KCMG). He was lord of the manor of Boyton, Wiltshire, and a deputy lieutenant and justice of the peace for the county.

Fane died on his post in Copenhagen after suffering from a pulmonary infection in March 1900. He was buried in St. Alban's Church, the English church in Copenhagen.

== Family ==
Fane married, in 1875, Constantia Eleanor Wood, daughter of General R. Blucher Wood. Their younger daughter Etheldred Constantia Fane (1879–1964) married Sir Horace Rumbold, 9th Baronet.

Diplomatic posts
| Preceded by Frederick Robert St John (as Consul-General) | Envoy Extraordinary and Minister Plenipotentiary to the Kingdom of Serbia; 1893–1898 | Succeeded by Edward Goschen |
| Preceded by Sir Charles Scott | Envoy Extraordinary and Minister Plenipotentiary to the Kingdom of Denmark; 1898–1900 | Succeeded by Sir Edward Goschen |
