= Terence Garvey =

British diplomat (1915–1986)

Sir Sir Terence Garvey KCMG

British Ambassador to the Soviet Union
- In office 1973–1976
- Preceded by: John Killick
- Succeeded by: Howard Smith

British High Commissioner to India
- In office 1971–1973
- Preceded by: Morrice James
- Succeeded by: Michael Walker

British Ambassador to Yugoslavia
- In office 1968–1971
- Preceded by: Duncan Wilson
- Succeeded by: Dugald Stewart

British Ambassador to Mongolia
- In office 1963–1964
- Succeeded by: Reginald Hibbert

British Chargé d'Affaires to China
- In office 1963–1965
- Preceded by: Michael Stewart
- Succeeded by: Donald Hopson

Personal details
- Born: December 7, 1915
- Died: December 7, 1986 (aged 71)
- Education: University College, Oxford
- Occupation: Diplomat
- Awards: Knight Commander of the Order of St Michael and St George (KCMG)

Sir Terence Garvey KCMG (7 December 1915 – 7 December 1986) was a British diplomat who was High Commissioner to India and Ambassador to the USSR.

== Career ==
Terence Willcocks Garvey was educated at Felsted School and University College, Oxford (where he gained a first class degree in Philosophy, Politics and Economics), and was a Laming Fellow at The Queen's College, Oxford, in 1938. In the same year he joined Her Majesty's Diplomatic Service. He served in the USA, Chile, Germany and Egypt as well as at the Foreign Office. He was Counsellor, HM Embassy, Belgrade, 1958–62; chargé d'affaires at Peking, and concurrently Britain's first ambassador to Mongolia, 1963–65; assistant Under-secretary of State at the Foreign Office 1965–68; ambassador to Yugoslavia 1968–71; High Commissioner to India 1971–73; and ambassador to the Soviet Union 1973–75.

After retiring from the Diplomatic Service Garvey became a Senior Associate Member of St Antony's College, Oxford. He is buried at Murrisk Abbey, county Mayo, Ireland.

== Honours ==
Terence Garvey was appointed CMG in the Queen's Birthday Honours of 1955 and knighted KCMG in the New Year Honours of 1969.

== Publications ==
- Bones of Contention: An Enquiry Into East-West Relations, Routledge & Kegan Paul, London, 1978, ISBN 0-7100-0010-3

== Offices held ==
Diplomatic posts
Preceded by Sir Michael Stewart	Chargé d'Affaires at Peking; 1963–1965	Succeeded by Sir Donald Hopson
New office	Ambassador Extraordinary and Plenipotentiary at Ulan Bator; 1963–1964	Succeeded by Reginald Hibbert
Preceded by Sir Duncan Wilson	Ambassador Extraordinary and Plenipotentiary at Belgrade; 1968–1971	Succeeded by Sir Dugald Stewart
Preceded by Sir Morrice James	High Commissioner to India; 1971–1973	Succeeded by Sir Michael Walker
Preceded by Sir John Killick	Ambassador Extraordinary and Plenipotentiary at Moscow; 1973–1976	Succeeded by Sir Howard Smith
