= Georg Joachim Göschen =

German publisher (1752–1828)

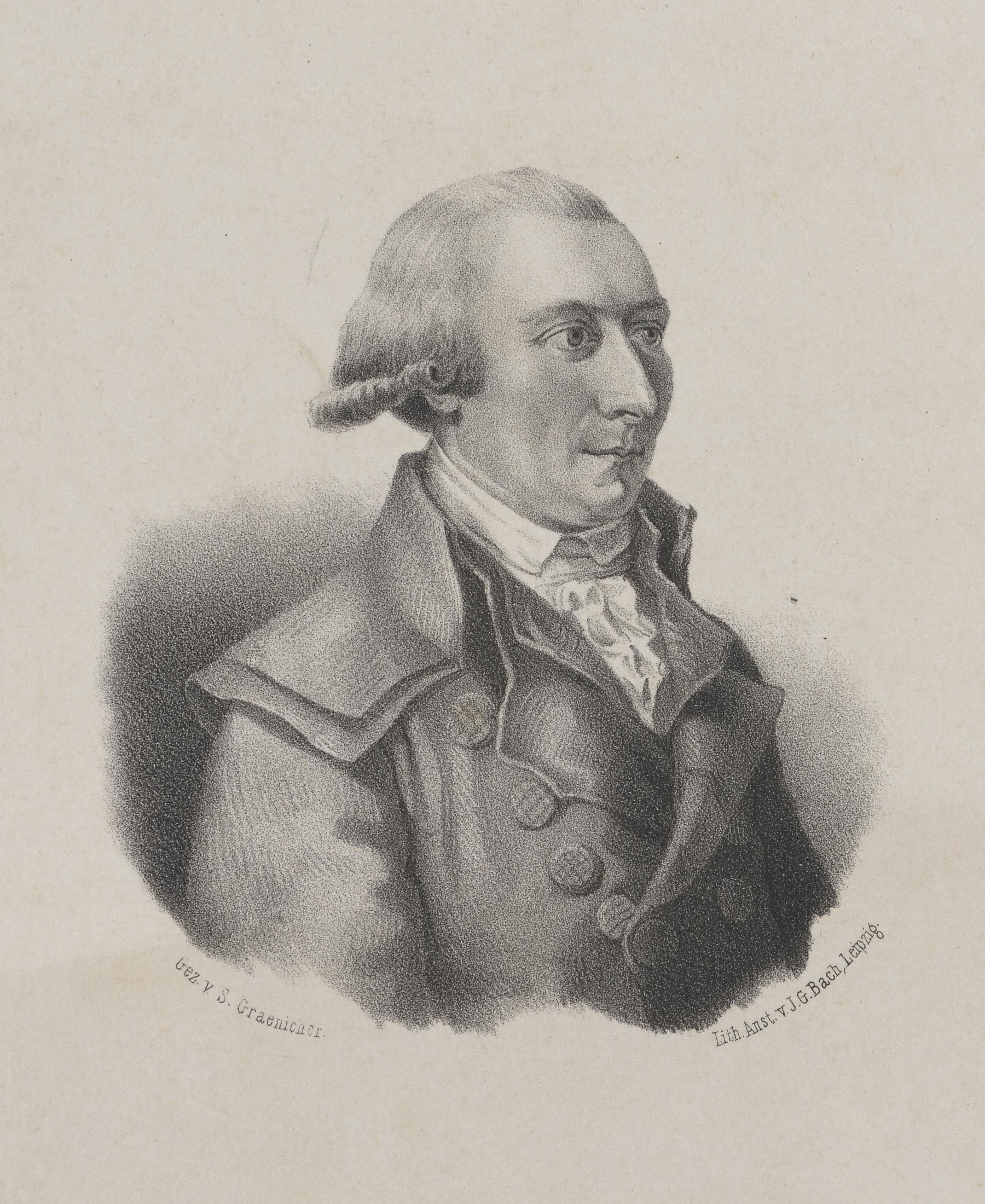
- Born: Jürgen Joachim von Göschen; 22 April 1752; Bremen, Holy Roman Empire
- Died: 5 April 1828 (aged 75); Grimma-Hohnstädt, Saxony
- Occupations: Printer, publisher, bookseller

Georg Joachim Göschen (22 April 1752 (Note: Several sources list 22 December 1752 as his date of birth; while others list 22 April 1752 as the date he was baptised.) – 5 April 1828) was a German publisher and bookseller in Leipzig, Kingdom of Saxony, notable for typography and his publications of music and philosophy. He was the patriarch of the Goschen family, whose English branch rose to prominence as bankers and politicians, including the Viscounts Goschen and Goschen baronets.

== Early life ==
Born Jürgen (or Georg) Joachim von Göschen, he was the second child of merchant Johann Reinhard and Gebeta Göschen. Johann's father, Emanuel, was a doctor who had settled in Bremen. Johann eventually was ruined financially and abandoned the family. Georg was admitted to the August Hermann Francke orphanage until relatives arranged for him to live in Arbergen with Rev. Hinrich Erhard Heeren, who educated him. At age 15, he began an apprenticeship with the bookseller Johann Heinrich Cramer in Bremen. In 1772, he moved to Leipzig, where he worked as an assistant to publisher Siegfried Leberecht Crusius.

== Career ==
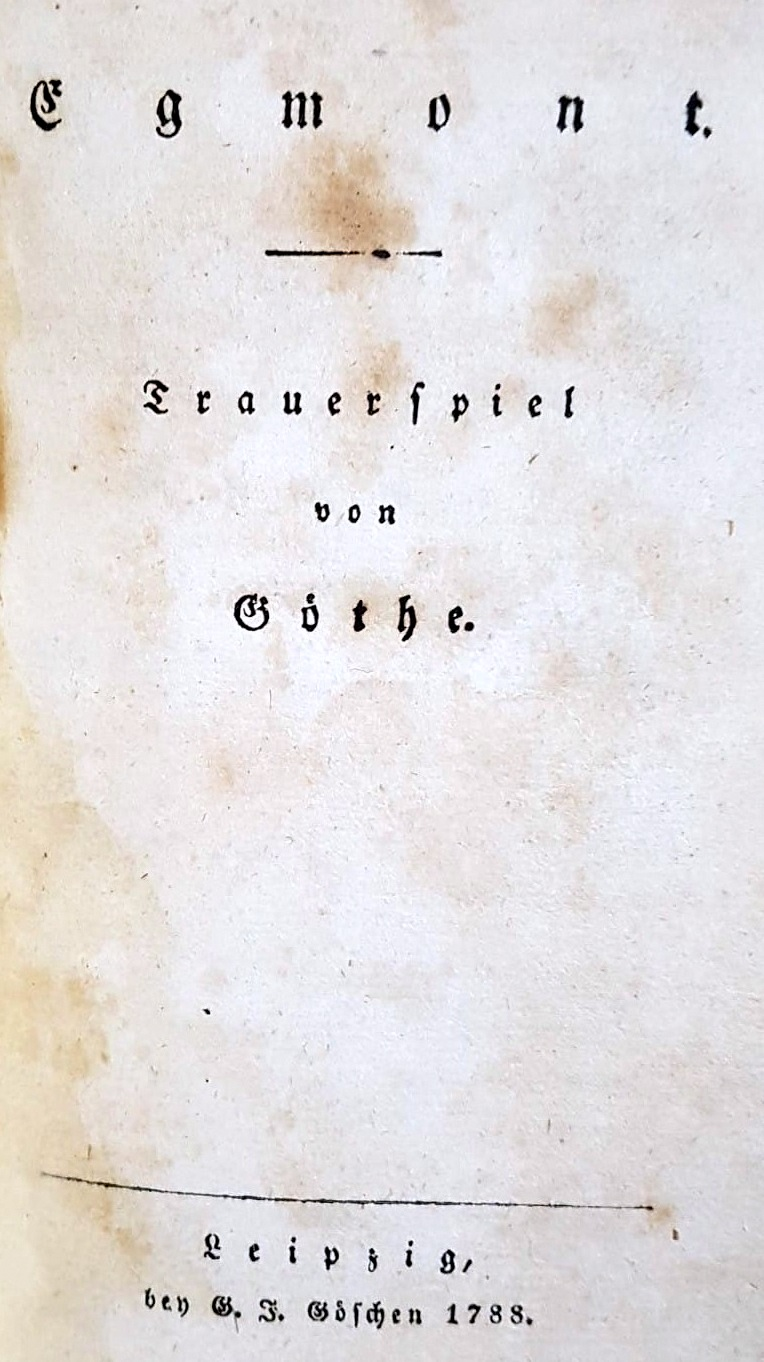
The title page of the first edition of Geothe's Egmont, 1788

In 1785, with the financial backing of Christian Gottfried Körner, Göschen opened his own publishing house in Leipzig, the G. J. Göschen'sche Verlagsbuchhandlung. His first major client was Körner's friend Friedrich Schiller, who was looking for someone to publish his journal Thalia. Göschen published numerous works for Schiller, including Don Carlos in 1787 and Geschichte des dreißigjährigen Kriegs (A History of the Thirty Years' War) in 1789.

One of Göschen's early successes was Rudolph Zacharias Becker's Noth- und Hülfsbüchlein für Bauersleute (Emergency Advice Booklet for Peasants). The book, which sold 30,000 copies in its first printing, became a pillar of German educational history.

Göschen much preferred to print more classic subjects and scientific journals, and was the first German publisher to print affordable books for the general public. From 1786 to 1790, he published the first complete edition of Johann Wolfgang von Goethe's works in eight volumes. He also published 42 volumes of the works of Christoph Martin Wieland.

He moved the printing house to Grimma in 1797. There he was granted an unlimited licence to print and was free from the restrictive rules of the Leipzig printers guild. Göschen has been lauded for his efforts to improve letterpress printing; with the best examples being deluxe editions of the Greek New Testament and Homer's works.

Göschen assumed a leadership role among German booksellers on issues such as copyright law and fixed prices. In 1802, he published his manifesto, "Meine Gedanken über den Buchhandel und über dessen Mängel, meine wenigen Erfahrungen und meine unmassgeblichen Vorschläge dieselben zu verbessern." (My Thoughts on the Bookselling Trade).

Göschen died in 1828. His youngest son, Hermann, sold the publishing house in 1838. Ownership of the company changed hands several times until it was purchased by Walter de Gruyter & Co. in 1919. where the publishing continued in the "Sammlung Göschen" (Collection Göschen).

== Family ==
In 1788, he married Johanna Henriette Heun, sister of author Heinrich Clauren. They had 10 children, six of whom survived into adulthood:

- Carl Friedrich Göschen-Beyer (1790–1881)
- Georg Joachim Göschen Jr. (1791–1855)
- Wilhelm Heinrich Göschen (1793–1866)
- Henriette (1795–1888), married firstly Franz Wilhelm Adolph Ludwig Susemihl; secondly Ludwig Moritz Otto von Schröter
- Friederike Charlotte (1802–1886), married Lambert Heinrich Peter Frühling
- Hermann Julius Göschen (1803–1846)

His third son Wilhelm Heinrich (William Henry) Göschen moved to England in 1814 and the next year co-founded the merchant banking firm ″Frühling & Göschen″, of Leipzig and London. Wilhelm's eldest son George Goschen entered politics and was raised to the peerage as Viscount Goschen in 1900. In 1903, Lord Goschen published a biography of his grandfather, The Life and Times of Georg Joachim Goschen, Publisher and Printer of Leipzig, 1752–1828.

Lord Goschen's younger brother Edward was made a baronet in 1916, while his nephew Harry Goschen was made a baronet in 1927.
