= Pauline Tennant =

British actress, poet and socialite (1927–2008)

- Pauline Tennant
- Born: Pauline Laetitia Tennant; 6 February 1927; London, England
- Died: 6 December 2008 (aged 81)
- Occupations: Actress; poet; socialite
- Years active: 1943–1949
- Title: Lady Rumbold
- Spouses: Julian Pitt-Rivers (m. 1946; div. 1953) Euan Douglas Graham (m. 1954; div. 1970) Sir Anthony Rumbold, 10th Baronet (m. 1974; died 1983)
- Children: Andrew Graham
- Parents: Hon. David Tennant (father); Hermione Baddeley (mother)
- Relatives: Edward Tennant (paternal uncle); Stephen Tennant (paternal uncle); Angela Baddeley (maternal aunt); Emma Tennant (first cousin); Stella Tennant (first cousin-once-removed)

Pauline Laetitia, Lady Rumbold (born Tennant, formerly Pitt-Rivers and Graham; 6 February 1927 – 6 December 2008) was a British actress, poet and socialite.

== Family ==
Born into an aristocratic family, she was the daughter of Hon. David Tennant and Hermione Baddeley. She was married three times, to Julian Pitt-Rivers (1946–1953); Euan Douglas Graham, grandson of the 5th Duke of Montrose (1954–1970); and Sir Anthony Rumbold, 10th Baronet (from 1974 until his death in 1983).

== Stage and screen ==
Tennant played on the West End stage in Ben Travers' She Follows Me About (1943) and alongside Fay Compton in No Medals (1947). She also appeared in two films: Great Day (1945) and The Queen of Spades (1949).

In an obituary for The Independent, the writer Philip Hoare described Tennant as "a true bohemian aristocrat—a tension of qualities that were literally in her genes". During her younger years she was often seen at the bar of the prestigious Ritz, London.

== Bibliography ==
- Montgomery-Massingberd, Hugh; Watkin, David (1980). The London Ritz: a social and architectural history. Aurum. ISBN 978-0-906053-01-0.
