= Percy Charles Hugh Wyndham =

British diplomat

Percy Charles Hugh Wyndham KCMG (born 23 September 1864;died 6 Oct. 1943), was a senior British diplomat. The son of Sir Hugh Wyndham, Wyndham was educated at Eton and New College, Oxford and entered the Diplomatic Service in 1890. He served at Berlin, Teheran, Constantinople, Madrid, Washington, D.C., Caracas, Brussels and Rome.He was Minister Plenipotentiary to the Republic of Colombia from 1911 to 1918.

Diplomatic posts
Preceded by Francis William Stronge	Minister Resident and Consul-General in the Republic of Colombia; 1911–1919	Succeeded by Lord Herbert Hervey
