= John Killick =

British ambassador (1919–2004)

Sir John Edward Killick GCMG (18 November 1919 – 12 February 2004) was a British diplomat who was ambassador to the Soviet Union, and later ambassador to NATO.

== Background ==
John Edward Killick was born at Isleworth in 1919. He was educated at Latymer Upper School, University College, London, and Bonn University. He served in the British Army during World War II, first in the Suffolk Regiment, and later in the 1st Airborne Division in which he commanded the 89th Field Security Section (Intelligence Corps) at Arnhem. He was captured by the Germans, and after release in 1945 he commanded the intelligence corps unit at Siegen.

== Career ==
Killick joined the Foreign Office in 1946 and served with the Allied High Commission in Germany 1948–51, at Berlin, Frankfurt and Bonn. He was private secretary to the Parliamentary Under-Secretary at the Foreign Office 1951–54, served at the embassy in Addis Ababa 1954–57, then attended the Canadian National Defence College (then located with the Canadian Land Forces Command and Staff College) 1957–58. He served in the Western European department at the Foreign Office 1958–62, attended the Imperial Defence College 1962–63, then was Head of Chancery at the embassy in Washington, D.C., 1963–68, and Assistant Under-Secretary at the Foreign and Commonwealth Office (FCO) 1968–71.

Killick was appointed Ambassador at Moscow in September 1971. Shortly after he arrived, the British government expelled 90 Russian intelligence officers, and Killick had to deal with the difficult Anglo-Soviet relations that followed. He returned to London 1973–75 as deputy to the Permanent Under-Secretary at the FCO, Sir Thomas Brimelow, and also Britain's Permanent Representative on the Council of the Western European Union. He was Permanent Representative to the North Atlantic Council (the governing body of NATO) 1975–79. In March 1979, after the murder of a bank employee near Killick's home in a Brussels suburb, it was reported that Killick had been the intended target of the Irish Republican Army.

After retiring in 1980, Killick and his wife, Lynette, moved to her home country of South Africa, where he was a director at Dunlop from 1980 to 1985. He returned to England after her death in 1984, and served as president of the Great Britain Atlantic Committee and the Atlantic Treaty Association.

== Personal life and death ==
Killick was married to Lynette du Preez from 1948 until her death in 1984. The following year, he married Monica Harries Easton, a fellow retired diplomat; they lived in Southborough, Kent, until her death in 1995.

In 1998, Killick suffered a stroke. He died from pneumonia at Kent and Sussex Hospital in Royal Tunbridge Wells on 12 February 2004, aged 84.

== Honours ==
Killick was appointed CMG in the New Year Honours of 1966, knighted KCMG in the Queen's Birthday Honours of 1971 and raised to GCMG in the Birthday Honours of 1979.

Sir John Killick Road, built on the former School of Service Intelligence site in Ashford, Kent, is named after him.

Diplomatic posts
Preceded by Sir Duncan Wilson	Ambassador Extraordinary and Plenipotentiary at Moscow; 1971–1973	Succeeded by Sir Terence Garvey
Preceded by Sir Edward Peck	Permanent Representative to the North Atlantic Council; 1975–1979	Succeeded by Sir Clive Rose
