= Arthur Goschen =

British Army general (1880–1975)

Major-General Arthur Goschen CB DSO** DL
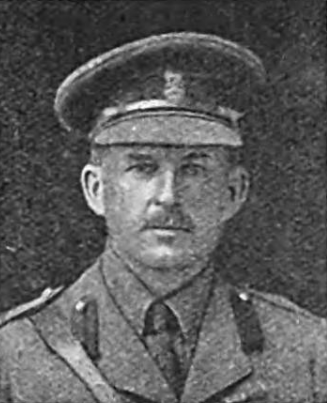
- Born: 6 January 1880; Marylebone, London, England
- Died: 28 June 1975 (aged 95); Cirencester, Gloucestershire, England
- Relatives: George Goschen, 1st Viscount Goschen (uncle); Sir Edward Goschen (uncle); Sir Harry Goschen (brother)
- Military career
- Allegiance: United Kingdom
- Branch: British Army
- Service years: 1899–1938; 1939–1941
- Rank: Major-General
- Nickname: "Jumbo"
- Service number: 21482
- Unit: Royal Artillery
- Commands: Royal Military Academy, Woolwich
- Conflicts: Second Boer War; First World War; Second World War
- Awards: Companion of the Order of the Bath; Distinguished Service Order & Two Bars; Mentioned in Despatches

Major-General Arthur Alec Goschen, CB, DSO & Two Bars, DL (6 January 1880 – 28 June 1975) was a British Army officer who served as an area commander during the Second World War.

== Family and education ==
Goschen was born in London, the child of Henry Goschen (1837–1932) and Augusta Eleanor Shakerley, niece of Sir Charles Shakerley, 1st Baronet. Henry Goschen was the younger brother of George Goschen, 1st Viscount Goschen.

Goschen's great-grandfather was prominent publisher and printer Georg Joachim Göschen of Leipzig, Kingdom of Saxony, whose third son Wilhelm Heinrich (William Henry) Göschen (1793–1866) came to England in 1814 and the next year co-founded the merchant banking firm Frühling & Göschen, of Leipzig and London. Wilhelm Heinrich married an English woman and had several children, including George, Charles Hermann, Henry, Alexander Heun and Sir Edward Goschen.

He was educated at Eton College. His elder brother was Sir Harry Goschen, 1st Baronet.

== Near drowning ==
On 7 September 1889, the cutter of the schooner Corinne (owned by his uncle Charles Hermann Goschen) was sailing near The Needles, with Arthur, his sister Eleanor, and crew on board. The cutter was capsized by a sudden gust of wind. The mate of the Corinne, John James Smith Gawn of Ryde, saved the two children but himself drowned. Another yachtsman also drowned.

== Military career ==
On 25 June 1899, Goschen was commissioned as a second lieutenant into the Royal Artillery. He saw active service in the Second Boer War from 1899 to 1901, was promoted to lieutenant on 16 February 1901 and awarded the Distinguished Service Order in September 1901. In 1911, he was serving in Cairo as Captain of J Battery, Royal Horse Artillery.

Goschen later served in the First World War as a brigade major for the Home Forces and in France, and was awarded bars to the Distinguished Service Order on 26 September 1917 and 26 July 1918. He had been promoted to brevet lieutenant colonel in January 1917.

Goschen graduated from the Staff College, Camberley in 1920. He was promoted to colonel in June 1925, with seniority dating back to January 1922. After instructing at the Senior Officer School and then serving as an instructor at the Staff College, Quetta, in India, he was appointed garrison commander and commandant at the Royal Artillery Depot at Woolwich in 1929, Brigadier Royal Artillery at Aldershot Command in June 1931. In March 1934 he was promoted to temporary major general which was soon after made substantive, and became commandant of the Royal Military Academy, Woolwich. In June 1935 he was appointed a Companion of the Order of the Bath. He retired in 1938 but was recalled as an Area Commander for the Chatham Area in 1939 at the start of the Second World War, before retiring again in 1941.

In retirement he became a Deputy Lieutenant for Gloucestershire.

== Family ==
In 1908 Goschen married Marjorie Mary Blacker; they had two sons and three daughters (Grania, Mary Gwendoline, and Diana Marjorie). Both their sons were in the military: Brigadier Geoffrey William Goschen (1911–1988), who married Mary, daughter of Lt. Col. Ernest Morrison-Bell; and Captain John Arthur Goschen (1918–1941), who was killed in action in the Siege of Tobruk.

Goschen died at Cirencester on 28 June 1975.

== Bibliography ==
- Smart, Nick (2005). Biographical Dictionary of British Generals of the Second World War. Barnesley: Pen & Sword. ISBN 1-84415-049-6.

Military offices
Preceded by Cyril Wagstaff	Commandant of the Royal Military Academy, Woolwich; 1934–1938	Succeeded by Philip Neame
