= List of ambassadors of the United Kingdom to Serbia =

The ambassador of the United Kingdom to Serbia is the United Kingdom's foremost diplomatic representative to the Serbia, and head of the United Kingdom's diplomatic mission in Belgrade.

== List of heads of mission ==
=== Consuls to Serbia ===
- 1837–1839: George Lloyd Hodges
- 1839–1842: No representative

=== Consuls-general to Serbia ===
- 1842–1859: Thomas de Grenier de Fonblanque
- 1860: Robert Bulwer-Lytton
- 1860–1869: John Augustus Longworth

=== Agents and consuls-general to Serbia ===
- 1869–1875: John Augustus Longworth
- 1875–1879: William Arthur White

=== Ministers resident ===
==== Principality of Serbia ====
- 1879–1881: Gerard Francis Gould
- 1881–1885: Sidney Locock (from 1882 to the Kingdom of Serbia)

==== Kingdom of Serbia ====
- 1885–1886: Hugh Wyndham

=== Envoys extraordinary and ministers plenipotentiary to the Kingdom of Serbia ===
- 1886–1888: George Hugh Wyndham
- 1888–1890 Frederick Robert St John

=== Consuls-general to the Kingdom of Serbia ===
- 1890–1892: Frederick Robert St John

=== Envoys extraordinary and ministers plenipotentiary ===
==== Kingdom of Serbia ====
- 1893–1898: Edmund Fane
  - 1892–1894: Ronald Douglas Grant Macdonald (as Vice-Consul)
  - 1894–1901: Ronald Douglas Grant Macdonald (as Consul)
- 1898–1900: Edward Goschen
- 1900–1903: Sir George Bonham, 2nd Baronet
- 1903–1906: Wilfred Gilbert Thesiger (deputy)
- 1906–1910: Sir James Whitehead
- 1910–1913: Sir Ralph Paget
- 1914–1919: Sir Charles des Graz

==== Kingdom of the Serbs, Croats and Slovenes ====
- 1919–1925: Sir Alban Young
- 1925–1929: SIr Howard Kennard

==== Kingdom of Yugoslavia ====
- 1929–1935: Sir Nevile Henderson
- 1935–1939: Sir Ronald H. Campbell
- 1939–1941: Sir Ronald I. Campbell
- 1941–1943: Sir George Rendel
- 1943–1946: Sir Ralph Stevenson

=== Ambassadors extraordinary and plenipotentiary ===
==== Federal People's Republic of Yugoslavia ====
- 1946–1951: Charles Peake
- 1951–1954: Sir Ivo Mallet
- 1954–1957: Sir Frank Roberts
- 1957–1960: Sir John Walter Nicholls
- 1960–1964: Sir Michael Creswell

==== Socialist Federal Republic of Yugoslavia ====
- 1964–1968: Sir Duncan Wilson
- 1968–1971: Sir Terence Garvey
- 1971–1977: Sir Dugald Stewart
- 1977–1980: Robert Farquharson
- 1980–1982: Sir Edwin Bolland
- 1982–1985: Kenneth Scott
- 1985–1989: Andrew Wood
- 1989–1992: Peter Hall

==== Federal Republic of Yugoslavia ====
- 1994–1997: Ivor Roberts (chargé d'affaires to 1995)
- 1997–1999: Brian Donnelly
- 1999–2000: Robert Gordon (head of the interest section)
- 2000–2001: David Landsman (chargé d'affaires)
- 2001–2003: Charles Crawford

=== Ambassadors ===
==== State Union of Serbia and Montenegro ====
- 2003: Sarah Price (chargé d'affaires)
- 2003–2006: David John Gowan

==== Republic of Serbia ====
- 2006–2007: David McIlroy (chargé d'affaires)
- 2007–2010: Stephen Wordsworth
- 2010–2011: Bill Longhurst (chargé d'affaires)
- 2011–2013: Michael Davenport
- 2013–2014: David McFarlane (chargé d'affaires)
- 2014–2019: Denis Keefe
- 2019: Tracy Gallagher (chargé d'affaires)
- 2019–2023: Sian MacLeod
- 2023: Dominic Otway (chargé d'affaires)
- 2023–present: Edward Ferguson

== See also ==
- Serbia–United Kingdom relations
- Foreign relations of the United Kingdom
