= Joseph Sebag & Company =

British stockbroking firm

Joseph Sebag & Company was a prominent stockbroking firm on the London Stock Exchange.

== Origins ==
The firm was founded in the second half of 19th century by Sir Joseph Sebag-Montefiore in the City of London. His sons Arthur M. Sebag-Montefiore (1853–1895) and Edmund Sebag-Montefiore was (1869–1929) followed him into the firm. In 1886 the partnership had consisted of Joseph, his son, Arthur and Charles Hermann Feiling. It was in that year that Joseph Sebag withdrew from the firm. At the time its offices were at 14 Throgmorton Street.

The senior partner in the 1920s was, Charles Edward Sebag-Montefiore (1884–1960; the son of Arthur), and then Charles’s son Denzil Sebag-Montefiore (1914–1996) joined the firm from Cambridge in 1934. Up until the First World War, the firm had almost solely serviced Jewish clients, but in the post-war boom it expanded its clientele and focus, adding Establishment figures as partners.

Sir Edward Goschen (1876–1933), formerly Controller of the Secretariat at the Egyptian Ministry of Finance, was made a partner in 1924.

One of the new partners in the inter-war period was Arthur James, a great-nephew of the Duke of Wellington. At the time once of its main dealers was E.H. Burgess Smith who provided the firm with stature in the market in mining shares. Burgess Smith and Samuel Cann were made partners during the Second World War.

Sir John Gilmour was a senior partner from 1950 until 1964 when he turned it into one of the top three or four corporate brokers.

Each partner had the right to nominate a son to succeed him in the partnership.

== Latter years ==
In 1979 the firm merged with WI Carr, which had a strong business in the Far East, and became Carr Sebag. At the time Sebag was still a partnership and had 25 partners. There was a substantial loss occasioned by unauthorised dealings for clients and reputed price manipulation practices in the Los Angeles branch office of the firm. In the US subsidiary alone the SIPC had to reimburse client losses of US$11.3 million. The SEC brought charges against the US subsidiary and one of its representatives in 1981.

The firm’s name disappeared abruptly in June 1982 when, after a process of seven weeks negotiations, a mooted merger with the other prominent firm of Grieveson Grant was called off suddenly. Instead the prize corporate finance division merged with Grieveson Grant and around half of the firms’ 40 partners and associates and 50 staff moved over to the other firm and the rest were made redundant. Carr Sebag stopped trading on 4 June 1982. Simultaneously the 75% it owned of W I Carr Overseas (known as WICO), a prominent firm in the Asian markets was sold to money brokers, Exco International for around GBP 3mn.
