= Grieveson Grant =

British stockbroking firm

Grieveson Grant was a prominent stockbroking firm on the London Stock Exchange.

== History ==
The firm was originally founded in 1869. In 1899 the firm had its offices at 61 Old Broad Street in the City of London. In the early 1970s, the firm was the largest in terms of member partners with 46 partners.

== Expansion in corporate finance ==
In June 1982 was engaged in merger talks with the long established stockbroking firm of Joseph Sebag & Company. After a process of seven weeks negotiations the mooted merger was called off suddenly. Instead the prize corporate finance division of Sebags merged with Grieveson Grant and around half of the firms’ 40 partners and associates and 50 staff moved over to the other firm and the rest were made redundant.

== Takeover by Kleinwort Benson ==
The prominent merchant bank, Kleinwort Benson, decided to enter the securities market buying Grieveson Grant in April 1986. Although, like many other banks at the time, Kleinwort Benson contemplated buying a jobbing firm in order to get into that part of the market, in the end it was saved from having to do so by the defection of a number of senior market-makers from Wedd Durlacher Mordaunt as it was acquired by Barclays Bank.

In 1995, Kleinwort Benson was acquired by Dresdner Bank and, as Dresdner Kleinwort, became its investment banking arm. Over a series of further closures and sales, the original business of Grieveson Grant was reduced and the name disappeared from corporate branding.
