= Goshen, Missouri =

Extinct hamlet in Missouri, U.S.

Coordinates: 40°22′58″N 93°40′47″W

Goshen is an extinct hamlet in Mercer County, in the U.S. state of Missouri.

== History ==
Goshen was originally called McKinneysville, and under the latter name was platted in 1860. A post office called Goshen was established in 1854, and remained in operation until 1904. The community derives its name from the Land of Goshen, a place mentioned in the Hebrew Bible. The community has since dissipated and is survived by a cemetery.
