= Goshen, Idaho =

Unincorporated community in Bingham County, Idaho, United States

- Unincorporated community
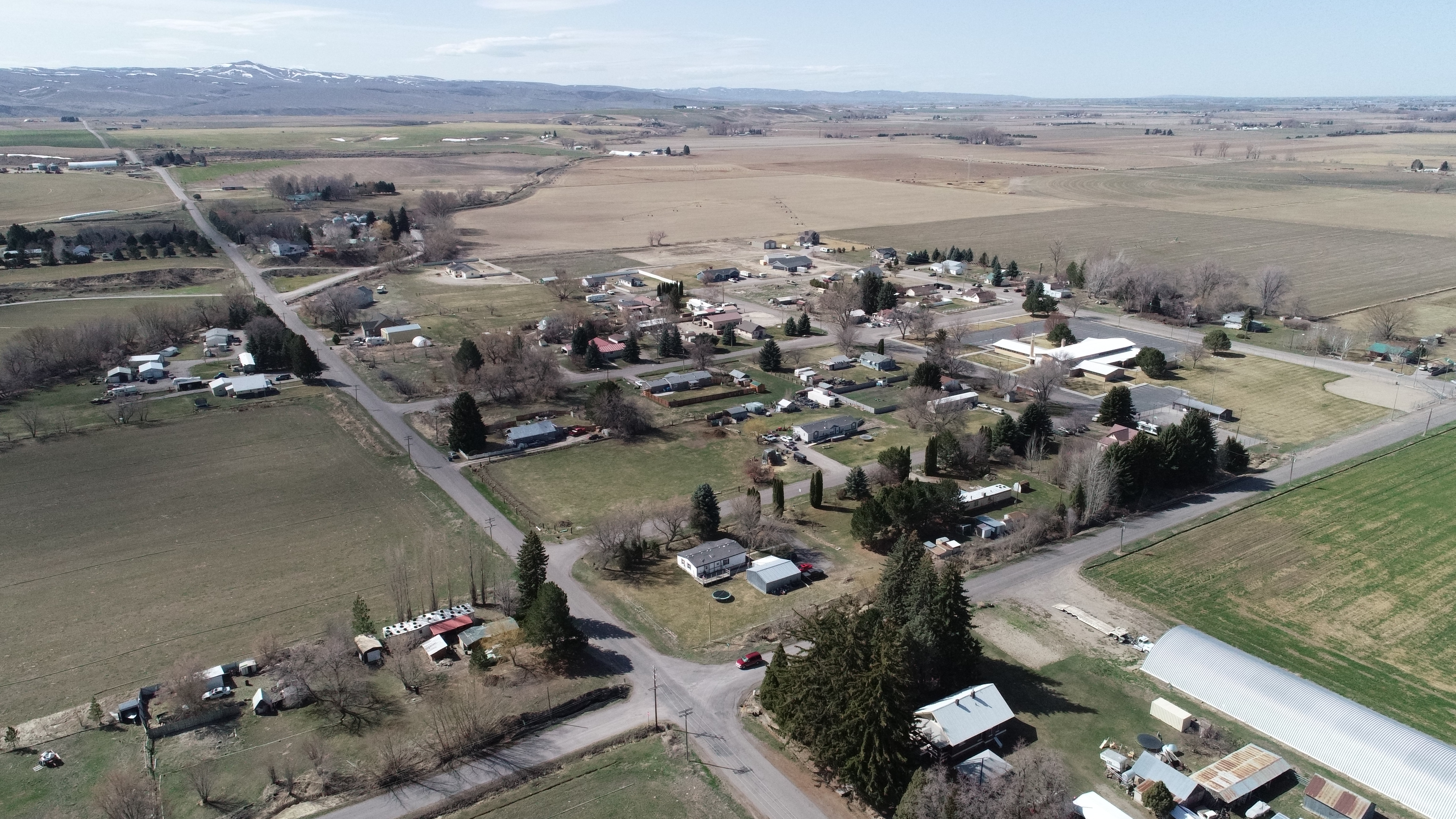
- Goshen, April 2022

- Location in Idaho Location in the United States
- Coordinates: 43°18′35″N 112°05′00″W
- Country: United States
- State: Idaho
- County: Bingham
- Named for: Land of Goshen
- Elevation: 4,636 ft (1,413 m)
- Time zone: UTC-7 (Mountain (MST))
  - Summer (DST): UTC-6 (MDT)
- Area codes: 208, 986
- GNIS feature ID: 372888

Goshen is an unincorporated community in Bingham County, Idaho, United States.

== History ==
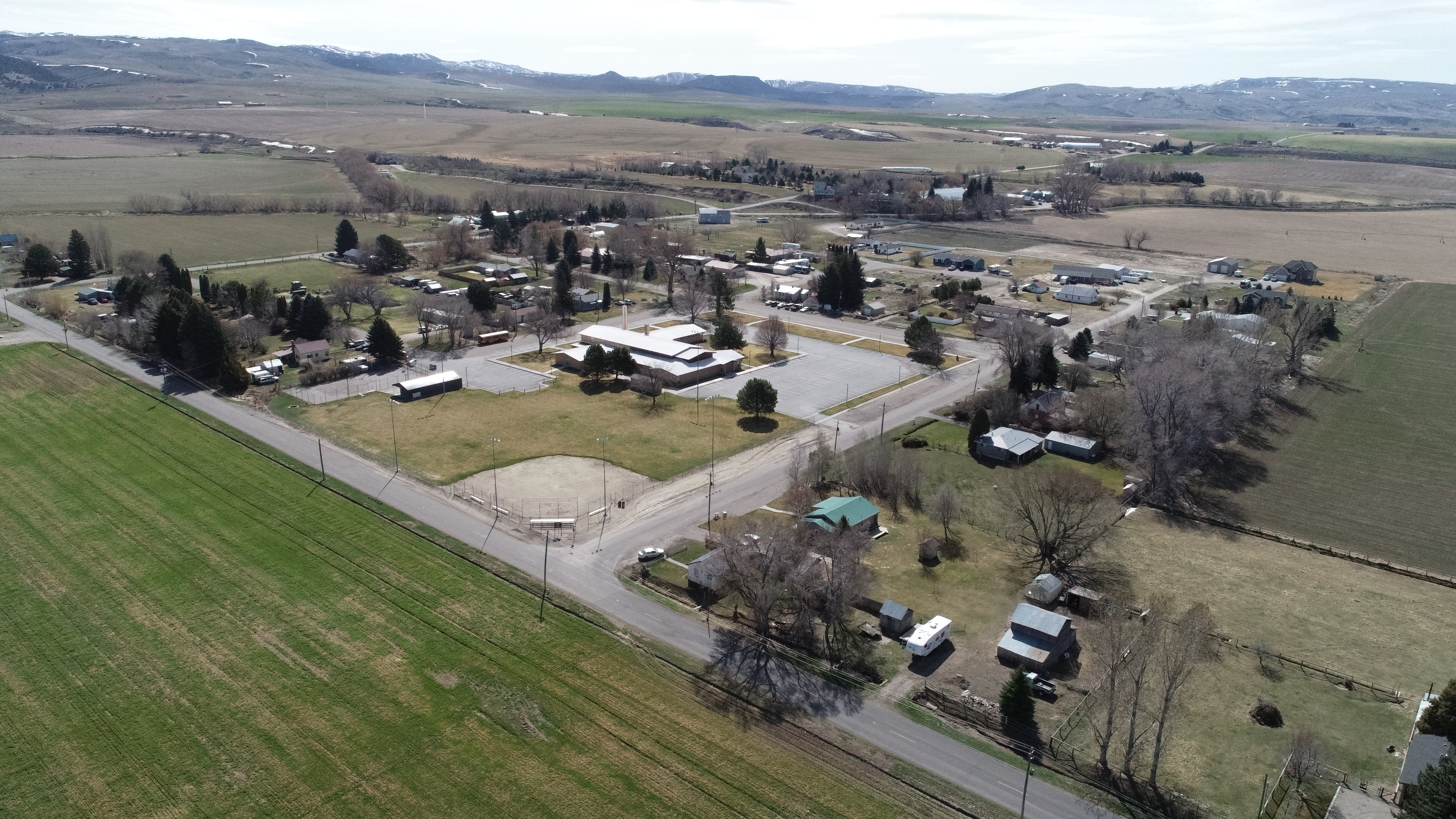
Goshen, April 2022

The first settlement at Goshen was made in 1883. A post office called Goshen was established in 1896, and remained in operation until 1905. The community was named after the Land of Goshen, a place mentioned in the Hebrew Bible.
