= Dugald Stewart (diplomat) =

British diplomat (1921–1984)

Sir Dugald Stewart KCVO CMG

British Ambassador to Yugoslavia
- In office 1971–1977
- Preceded by: Sir Terence Garvey
- Succeeded by: Robert Farquharson

Personal details
- Born: 10 September 1921
- Died: 22 November 1984 (aged 63)
- Children: 4
- Education: Magdalen College, Oxford
- Occupation: Diplomat

Sir Dugald Leslie Lorn Stewart (10 September 1921 – 22 November 1984) was a British diplomat who served as ambassador to Yugoslavia from 1971 to 1977.

== Early life and education ==
Stewart was born on 10 September 1921, the son of Allan Winslow Stewart, 15th of Appin. He held the position of 16th chief of the clan Stewart of Appin on his father's death in 1953. He was educated at Eton College and Magdalen College, Oxford.

== Career ==
Stewart began his career as an administrative assistant in the Foreign Office in 1942 before he was appointed a member of the Foreign Service in 1945. He was posted to Belgrade in 1945 and acted as head of the mission in 1947 before he was seconded to the Control Commission for Germany, British section, at Berlin in 1948.

Stewart was promoted to second secretary in 1949, and after spending a year in the Foreign Office was appointed assistant oriental secretary at Cairo in 1951. In 1954, he was promoted to first secretary, and in 1956 was posted to Belgrade as first secretary (information). After three years at the Foreign Office he was promoted and served as counsellor (commercial) at Moscow from 1962 to 1965.

After serving as an inspector of the Diplomatic Service for two years, Stewart was transferred to Cairo as counsellor, a post he held until 1970. In 1971, he was appointed ambassador to Yugoslavia, remaining in the post until his retirement from the Diplomatic Service in 1977.

== Personal life and death ==
Stewart married Sibyl Anne Sturrock, MBE in 1947 whom he met during his first tour in Yugoslavia. She was decorated for her war service with the partisans.

On retirement from the Diplomatic Service, Stewart returned to his remote home in Appin, Scotland. He died on 22 November 1984, aged 63.

== Honours ==
Stewart was appointed Companion of the Order of St Michael and St George (CMG) in the 1969 New Year Honours. He was appointed Knight Commander of the Royal Victorian Order (KCVO) in 1972.

== See also ==
- United Kingdom–Yugoslavia relations

Diplomatic posts
Preceded by Sir Terence Garvey	British Ambassador to Yugoslavia; 1971–1977	Succeeded by Robert Farquharson
