= Goschen baronets =

Baronetcy in the Baronetage of the United Kingdom

Arms of Goschen, Baronets of Beacon Lodge: Argent, a heart gules, flamant and transfixed by an arrow bendwise, point upwards proper.

There have been two baronetcies created for persons with the surname Goschen, both in the Baronetage of the United Kingdom. One creation is extant as of 2017.

The Goschen baronetcy, of Beacon Lodge, in the parish of Highcliffe, in the County of Southampton, was created in the Baronetage of the United Kingdom on 17 January 1916 for the diplomat Sir Edward Goschen. He served as British Ambassador to Germany from 1908 until the outbreak of the First World War in 1914. As of 2016, the title is held by his great-grandson, the fourth Baronet, who succeeded his father in 2001. The Conservative politician George Goschen, 1st Viscount Goschen, was the elder brother of the first Baronet and the uncle of the first Baronet of the 1927 creation (see below).

The Goschen baronetcy, of Durrington House in the Parish of Sheering and County of Essex, was created in the Baronetage of the United Kingdom in the 1927 Birthday Honours on 27 June 1927 for the businessman Sir Harry Goschen, for public services. He was the son of Henry Goschen, younger brother of George Goschen, 1st Viscount Goschen, and elder brother of the first Baronet of the 1916 creation (see above). The title became extinct on his death in 1945. Major-General Arthur Goschen was a younger brother of Sir Harry.

== Goschen baronets, of Beacon Lodge (1916) ==
- Sir (William) Edward Goschen, 1st Baronet (1847–1924)
- Sir Edward Henry Goschen, 2nd Baronet (1876–1933)
- Sir Edward Christian Goschen, 3rd Baronet (1913–2001)
- Sir (Edward) Alexander Goschen, 4th Baronet (born 1949)

The heir presumptive to the baronetcy is the present holder's second cousin, Sebastian Goschen (born 1959).

== Goschen baronets, of Durrington House (1927) ==
- Sir (William) Henry Neville "Harry" Goschen, 1st Baronet (1865–1945)

== Title succession chart ==
Title succession chart, Viscounts Goschen and Goschen baronets (both creations)

Wilhelm Heinrich (William Henry) Goschen; 1793–1866
Viscount Goschen	Goschen baronetcy of Beacon Lodge
George Joachim Goschen; 1831–1907; 1st Viscount Goschen	Henry Goschen; 1837–1932	William Edward Goschen; 1847–1924; 1st Baronet
Goschen baronetcy of Durrington House
George Joachim Goschen; 1866–1952; 2nd Viscount Goschen	William Goschen; 1870–1943	Harry Goschen; 1865–1945; Baronet	Edward Henry Goschen; 1876–1933; 2nd Baronet	George Goschen; 1887–1953
Baronetcy extinct
George Goschen; 1893–1916	Brig. Gen. William Goschen; 1900–1944	John Alexander Goschen; 1906–1977; 3rd Viscount Goschen	Edward Goschen; 1913–2001; 3rd Baronet	Alexander Goschen; 1915–1975	David Goschen; 1931–1980
Giles John Harry Goschen b. 1965; 4th Viscount Goschen	Alexander Goschen b. 1949; 4th Baronet	Sebastian Goschen b. 1959
Alexander Goschen b. 2001

== See also ==
- Viscount Goschen
