= Sir Edward Goschen, 2nd Baronet =

British baronet

Sir Edward Henry Goschen, 2nd Baronet (9 March 1876, Paris – 7 August 1933, Oxford), was a British diplomat.

== Family and life ==
Goschen was the son of Sir Edward Goschen, 1st Baronet, and Harriet Hosta Clarke. He married Mary Danneskjold-Samsöe, daughter of Count Christian Frederick Danneskjold-Samsøe, on 31 July 1908.

Goschen was a grandson of William Henry Goschen, founder of the merchant banking firm of "Frühling & Göschen" in the City of London in 1815. He was nephew of the first Viscount Goschen, who was Chancellor of the Exchequer, First Lord of the Admiralty, and Chancellor of the University of Oxford, and a first cousin of Sir Harry Goschen, Baronet, of Durrington House.

He was educated at Eton College, which he went to in 1889. He followed his father into the Diplomatic Service, when in 1897 he was appointed an honorary attaché to the Embassy in Saint Petersburg. Upon declaration of the Boer War in South Africa he volunteered his services.

After the end of the war, he returned to the Diplomatic Service, and was then appointed an honorary attaché to the Legation at Tangier. After three years he was sent to Egypt as private secretary to Sir William Garstin at the Ministry of Public Works, and in 1908 joined the staff of the Egyptian Foreign Office. He was Controller of the Secretariat at the Egyptian Ministry of Finance.

Goschen was appointed an Officer of the Order of the Crown of Italy in the London Gazette for 2 July 1909, and then appointed by His Highness the Khedive of Egypt to receive the Order of the Medjidieh 2nd Class in the London Gazette for 15 September 1911, and eventually received on the recommendation of His Highness the Sultan of Egypt the Order of the Nile 3rd Class in the London Gazette for 29 December 1916.

He succeeded as the 2nd Baronet Goschen, of Beacon Lodge, Southampton, on 20 May 1924.

He was made a partner of the London stockbroking firm of Joseph Sebag & Company in 1924. He was one of the Trustees of the Stock Exchange Benevolent Fund.

He died on 7 August 1933 at age 57.

Baronetage of the United Kingdom
Preceded by Edward Goschen	Baronet of Beacon Lodge; 1924–1933	Succeeded by Edward Goschen
