= Duncan Wilson (diplomat) =

British diplomat (1911–1983)

Sir Archibald Duncan Wilson GCMG (12 August 1911 – 20 September 1983) was a British diplomat and Master of Corpus Christi College, Cambridge.

== Background ==
Wilson was born on 12 August 1911 in Winchester to Archibald Edward Wilson, German teacher at Winchester College, and Ethel Wilson, daughter of banker and financier Felix Schuster. His father died during his childhood, in 1923. Wilson's youngest sister was the philosopher Mary Warnock. Another younger sister, Grizel, married his Balliol friend, the historian and civil servant Michael Balfour.

Wilson was educated at Sandroyd School then Winchester College and Balliol College, Oxford, where he studied Classics.

== Career ==
After his studies in Oxford he applied for the Diplomatic Service but due to a chest ailment was not successful. He then spent a year teaching in Westminster School and then joined the British Museum as assistant keeper in 1937.

During World War II, in which he served in the Ministry of Information and the Ministry of Economic Warfare, the opportunity arose to join the Foreign Office. After the war, he served in Berlin for the Allied Control Commission for Germany.

He then specialized in Communist affairs and held the following positions:

- Charge d'affaires in Peking 1957–59
- Ambassador to Yugoslavia 1964–1968
- Ambassador to the USSR 1968–1971

He retired from the diplomatic service in 1971 and was appointed Master of Corpus Christi College, Cambridge. While at Corpus he was also Chairman of the Appeal Committee of Cambridge University and was instrumental in the procurement of a new building to house the Faculty of Music. He retired from the Mastership in 1980 and was succeeded by Michael McCrum.

== Personal life and death ==
Wilson married Elizabeth Fleming in 1937 and had three children. His daughter Elizabeth married Romanian pianist Radu Lupu. Wilson was a good friend of the composer Benjamin Britten and the cellist Mstislav Rostropovich.

Wilson died on 20 September 1983, aged 72, from complications following two heart attacks. At the time of his death, he had been working on a biography of Gilbert Murray, which his wife finished and published in 1988.

== Publications ==
Wilson wrote several books including:

- Tito's Yugoslavia (1979)
- Leonard Woolf: A Political Biography, ed. Powell, (1978), ISBN 0-312-48001-6
- Life and Times of Vuk Stefanović Karadžić (1970)

== Notes ==
Diplomatic posts
Preceded by Sir Michael Creswell	Ambassador Extraordinary and Plenipotentiary at Belgrade; 1964–1968	Succeeded by Sir Terence Garvey
Preceded by Sir Geoffrey Harrison	Ambassador Extraordinary and Plenipotentiary at Moscow; 1968–1971	Succeeded by Sir John Killick
Academic offices
Preceded by Sir Frank Lee	Master of Corpus Christi College, Cambridge; 1971–1980	Succeeded by Michael McCrum
