= Solomon Sebag =

- Born: 1828; Essaouira, Morocco
- Died: 30 April 1892 (aged 63–64); Spanish and Portuguese Jews' Hospital, London, United Kingdom
- Occupations: Educator, writer

Solomon Sebag (1828 – 30 April 1892) was an English educator and Hebrew writer.

== Biography ==
Solomon Sebag was born in 1828 in Essaouira, Morocco, the son of Rabbi Isaac Sebag. He was educated at the orphan school of the Portuguese congregation of London.

Sebag later took on the role of master at the Sha'are Tikvah School. Upon the passing of Ḥazzan de Sola, he temporarily assumed the position of reader at the Bevis Marks Synagogue. He turned down a permanent appointment, however, on the grounds that it would disrupt his attendance at the opera, to which he was devoted.

In 1852, Sebag wrote a Hebrew primer that served for a long time as the chief textbook for Hebrew education among Jewish children in England. He also published various Hebrew poems and odes for special occasions.

== Selected publications ==
- The Hebrew Primer and Reading Book. London. 1871 [1852].
- Lines written on the death of the late lamented Rev. Barnett Abrahams. London: S. Meldola. 1864.
