= Frederick Robert St John =

British diplomat (1831–1923)

Sir Frederick Robert St John KCMG (2 March 1831 – 27 February 1923) was a British diplomat.

== Background ==
St John was the fourth son of Hon. Ferdinand St John, third son of George St John, 3rd Viscount Bolingbroke and his wife Selina Charlotte Keatinge, daughter of Maurice St Leger Keatinge. He was educated at Cheltenham College. In 1855, St John entered the diplomatic service and was sent as attaché to Florence and then to Stuttgart. He was promoted to second secretary at the Embassy in Peking in 1862 and afterwards was moved to Constantinople and later to Vienna.

== Career ==
From 1872, he was secretary of legation at the Embassy at Buenos Aires, from 1877 at Rio de Janeiro and in 1879 returned as secretary of embassy to Constantinople. Two years later, St John was appointed Minister Resident and Consul-General to Central America and, in 1884, he became Minister Resident and Consul-General to the United States of Colombia. Just before the end of the year, he was transferred as Minister Resident to the Republic of Venezuela, an office he held until 1888.

St John served subsequently as Envoy Extraordinary and Minister Plenipotentiary to the Kingdom of Serbia until 1890 and as Consul-General to Serbia until 1892. In the following year, he was appointed Envoy Extraordinary and Minister Plenipotentiary to the Swiss Confederation. St John retired in 1901 and was knighted as a Knight Commander of the Order of St Michael and St George (KCMG) in the King's 1901 Birthday Honours list, and invested as such by King Edward VII at St James's Palace on 17 December 1901.

== Family ==
On 18 April 1882, he married Isabella Annie FitzMaurice, second daughter of Captain Hon. James Terence FitzMaurice, son of Thomas FitzMaurice, 5th Earl of Orkney. They had six children, three sons and three daughters. Peter St John, 9th Earl of Orkney is the grandson of this marriage.

Diplomatic posts
Preceded by ?	Minister Resident and Consul-General to Central America; 1881–1884	Succeeded by ?
Preceded by James Plaister Harriss-Gastrell	Minister Resident and Consul-General to the United States of Colombia; Mar – Dec 1884	Succeeded by William John Dickson
Preceded by Charles Edward Mansfield	Minister Resident to the Republic of Venezuela; 1884–1888	Succeeded by ?
Preceded by Hugh Wyndham	Envoy Extraordinary and Minister Plenipotentiary to the Kingdom of Serbia; 1888–1890	Succeeded by Himself
Preceded by Himself	Consul-General to the Kingdom of Serbia; 1890–1892	Succeeded by Edmund Douglas Veitch Fane
Preceded by Charles Stewart Scott	Envoy Extraordinary and Minister Plenipotentiary to the Swiss Confederation; 1893–1901	Succeeded by Conyngham Greene
