= Bill Baddeley =

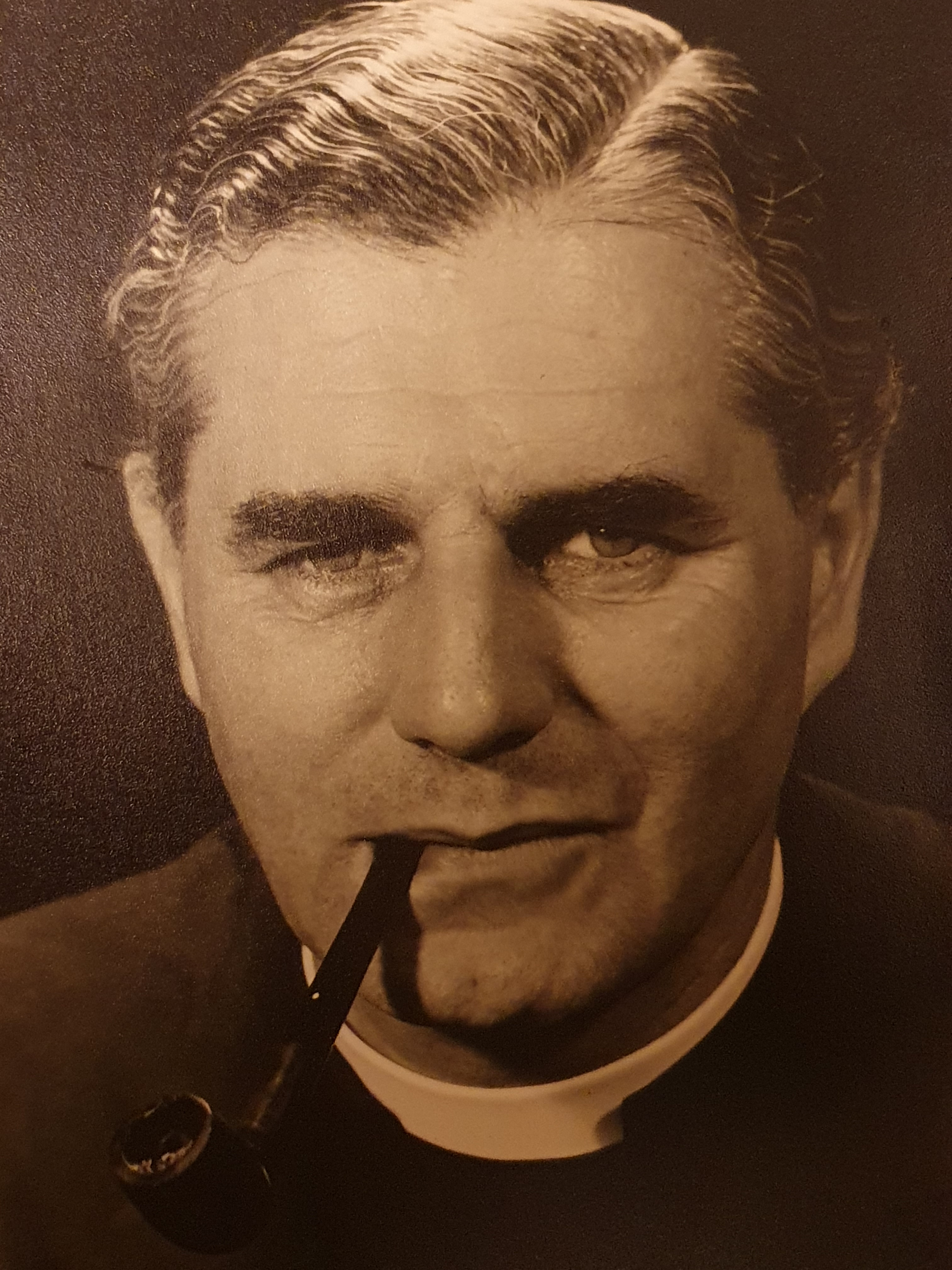

The Very Reverend William Pye Baddeley (20 March 1914 – 31 May 1998) was an Anglican priest who was the Dean of Brisbane from 1958 to 1967.

== Early life ==
He was born in Shropshire on 20 March 1914, the son of the French singer Louise Bourdin. His mother had married a composer, William Clinton-Baddeley, in 1896, with whom she had a number of children, including the actresses Angela and Hermione Baddeley. By 1914 Clinton-Baddeley had left, and Bourdin had taken in lodgers. It was to one of these, known only as 'Uncle Pye', that William Pye Baddeley was born. The young William was given away to a family in Fulham, where his birth was registered. Unlike his half-sisters, who were educated privately, Baddeley was educated at a local school. The Rev Cyril Easthaugh of St John the Divine, Kennington arranged for Baddeley to attend a crammer at Tatterford, Norfolk, then Baddeley went on to study at Durham University and Cuddesdon, Oxford.

== Clerical career ==
Having graduated from St Chad's College, Durham and trained for ordination at Ripon College Cuddesdon, Baddeley was ordained deacon in 1941 and priest in 1942, and served curacies at St Luke's, Camberwell (1941-1944), St Anne's Church, Wandsworth (1944-1946) and St Stephen's Church, Bournemouth (1946-1949).

He was then appointed Vicar of St Pancras (1949–58), where he raised funds for its restoration and where his contribution to the spiritual life of London was noted by Martin Israel. During that time he was also Chaplain to the Elizabeth Garrett Anderson Hospital (1949-1958) and St Luke's Hospital for the Clergy (1952-1954). In 1958 he was appointed Dean of Brisbane. Upon his return to England he was Rector of St James's, Piccadilly from 1967 to 1980, during which period restoration of Sir Christopher Wren's spire was completed after bombing in the war. He was Chaplain to the Royal Academy of Arts (1968–80), Chairman of the Malcolm Sargent Cancer Fund for Children (1968–92) and a Life Governor of the Thomas Coram Foundation for Children from 1955.

He was also active in Australian civic life when he was in Brisbane, being active in the arts as President of the Brisbane Repertory Theatre (1961–64) and Director of the Australian Elizabethan Theatre Trust (1963–67), and making television and other media appearances to which "the Australian public responded, as had his English audiences, to his joie de vivre"; as Sir James Killen recalled, "There was nothing sedating about his sermons."

== Personal life ==
He married Shirley (née Wyatt), who was daughter of Lt-Col Ernest Wyatt CBE DSO, a niece of Field Marshal Sir Claud Jacob, first cousin of Lt-Gen Sir Ian Jacob, and a direct descendant of both Robert Caldwell and twice-appointed Apothecary to the Household John Nussey, who was master of the Worshipful Society of Apothecaries of London. They had one daughter.

He died on 31 May 1998.
