= Goshen, Walker County, Texas =

Goshen
- Unincorporated community
- Interactive map of Goshen
- Coordinates: 30°37′20″N 95°43′17″W
- Country: United States
- State: Texas
- County: Walker
- Elevation: 341 ft (104 m)

Goshen, sometimes called Hutcheson, is an unincorporated area in Walker County, Texas, United States.

== See also ==
- Goshen
