= Goshen, Henderson County, Texas =

Goshen
- Interactive map of Goshen
- Coordinates: 32°21′11″N 96°00′41″W
- Country: United States
- State: Texas
- County: Henderson
- Elevation: 404 ft (123 m)

Goshen is an unincorporated area and abandoned settlement in Henderson County, Texas, United States. Its location was described as "on Trim Creek eight miles northeast of Eustace in northwestern Henderson County." There is a cemetery there with about 450 graves.

== See also ==
- Goshen
