= Harry Goschen =

British businessman and banker (1865–1945)

Sir Harry Goschen KBE JP DL
- Sir Harry in 1927
- Born: William Henry Neville Goschen; 30 October 1865; Mayfair, London
- Died: 7 July 1945 (aged 79); Harlow, Essex
- Occupations: Businessman, banker
- Military career
- Allegiance: United Kingdom
- Branch: British Army
- Service years: 1886–1918
- Rank: Major (honorary)
- Unit: London Regiment

Arms of Goschen family: Argent, a heart gules, flamant and transfixed by an arrow bendwise, point upwards proper

Sir William Henry Neville Goschen, 1st Baronet (30 October 1865 – 7 July 1945), known as Harry Goschen, was a British businessman and banker from the prominent Goschen family.

== Family and early life ==
Harry was born at 7 Chapel Street, Grosvenor Square, London, the son of Henry Goschen (1837–1932) and Augusta Eleanor Shakerley, niece of Sir Charles Shakerley, 1st Baronet. Henry Goschen was the younger brother of George Goschen, 1st Viscount Goschen.

Their grandfather was prominent publisher and printer Georg Joachim Göschen of Leipzig, Kingdom of Saxony. His third son Wilhelm Heinrich (William Henry) Göschen (1793–1866) came to England in 1814 and founded together with the German merchant Heinrich Frühling (1790–1841) the merchant bank Frühling & Göschen, of Leipzig and London. He married an English woman and had several children, including George, Henry and Edward.

Harry's younger brother was Major General Arthur Goschen. Harry was educated at Eton College from 1879 to 1884. In 1886, he was gazetted as a lieutenant in the 24th Middlesex Volunteer Rifles, the London Regiment.

== Career ==
Goschen joined the family merchant banking firm Frühling & Göschen where he later became senior partner. He became involved in insurance, serving as director of the Ocean Marine Insurance Co., Sun Insurance Office and Sun Life Assurance Society. His personality and role during the First World War were later recalled in The Times:

Those who worked with him and consulted him were sure of getting from him sound and disinterested views as to the practical aspects of a problem. This faculty, combined with his unfailing readiness to work hard for what he believed to be the best interests of the City, and of the national and international well-being which is its chief concern, caused Sir Harry Goschen to be called to offices of high responsibility in the critical period during and after the 1914–18 war.

In 1920, he merged his family's bank Frühling & Göschen with Cunliffe Brothers, owned by Lord Cunliffe, to form Goschens & Cunliffe. He remained as partner until his retirement in 1936.

During his career, he served as chairman of the London Clearing banks from 1918 and the National Provincial Bank. He Chaired the Accepting Houses Committee from 1921 during the challenging post-war period. He was Chair of the Agricultural Mortgage Corporation Ltd. He was a director of the Atlas Assurance Company. He was a director of the Chartered Bank of India, Australia, and China.

Goschen served as Prime Warden of the Worshipful Company of Goldsmiths 1919-1920.

Goschen was appointed Deputy lieutenant for Essex in 1920.

== Honours ==
Goschen was appointed an Officer of the Order of the British Empire (OBE) in the 1918 Birthday Honours for his services during the First World War. He was knighted in the same order (KBE) in April 1920, for "valuable services on many Government Committees" during the war.

In the 1927 Birthday Honours, Goschen was created a Baronet, of Durrington House in the Parish of Sheering and County of Essex, in the Baronetage of the United Kingdom, for public services.

He was also a Knight of Grace of the Order of St. John of Jerusalem.

== Personal life ==
On 23 November 1893, Goschen married Christian (1871–1951), daughter of Lt.-Col. James Augustus Grant. They had one daughter, Christian Eleanor Margaret, in 1895. She married Claud Douglas-Pennant, grandson of Edward Douglas-Pennant, 1st Baron Penrhyn, and younger brother of the fifth Baron Penrhyn.

Harry Goschen died at Durrington House, his Essex estate, in 1945. The baronetcy became extinct upon his death.

Baronetage of the United Kingdom
New creation	Baronet of Durrington House; 1927–1945	Extinct
