= Hugh Wyndham (diplomat) =

British diplomat (1836–1916)

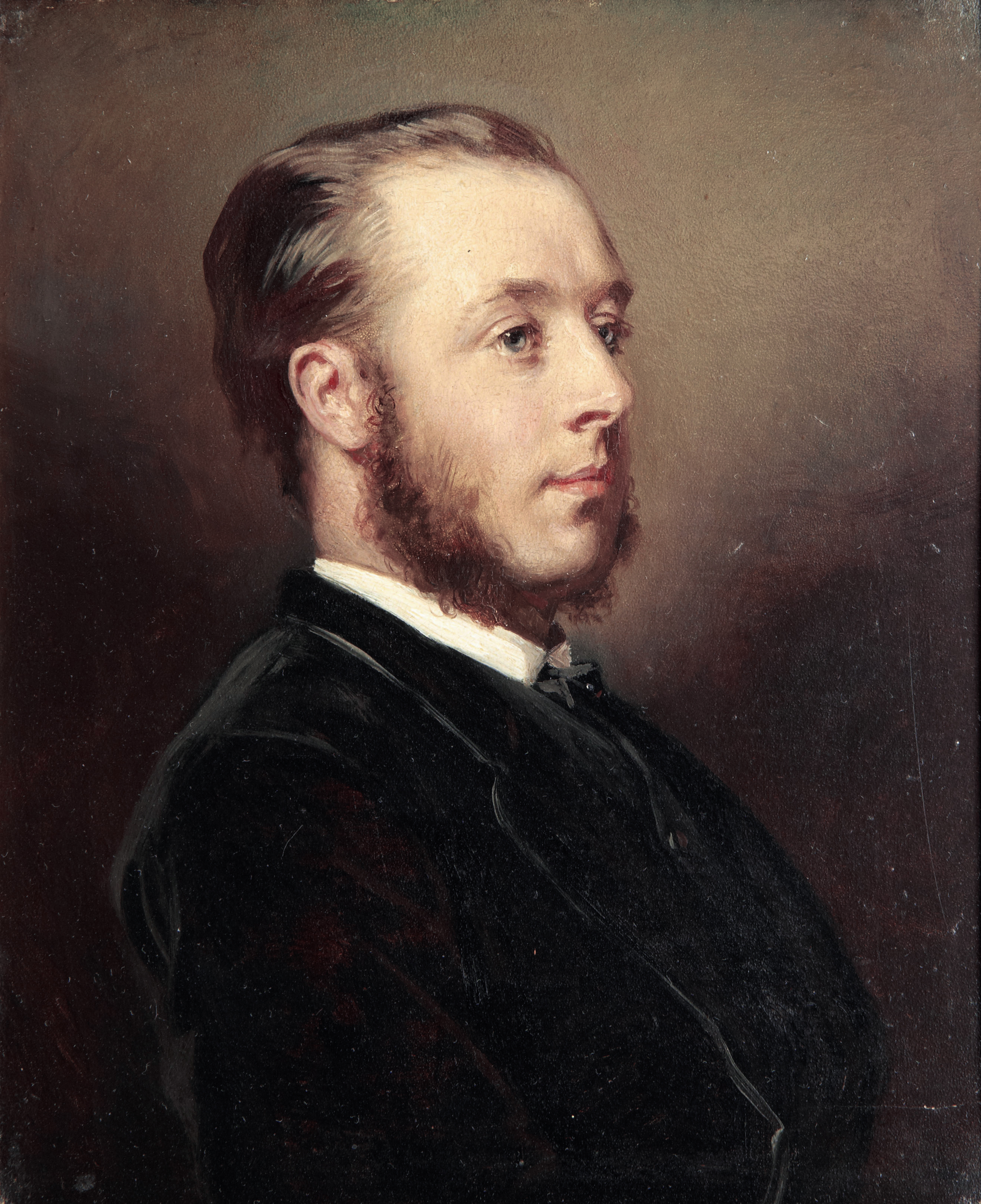
George Hugh Wyndham (Richard L. Lauchert, 1868)

Sir George Hugh Wyndham KCMG CB JP (18 November 1836 – 10 February 1916) was a British diplomat who was minister to Serbia, Brazil and Romania.

== Career ==
George Hugh Wyndham was educated at Harrow School and Exeter College, Oxford and entered the Diplomatic Service in 1857. He accompanied Sir Frederick Bruce to China in 1859 and stayed there for two years. He then served as consul-general at Warsaw and subsequently as Secretary of the legations or embassies at Athens, Madrid, St Petersburg and Constantinople (where in 1883 it fell to him, as Chargé d'Affaires to the Sublime Porte, to sign a declaration amending the convention for the suppression of the slave trade that had been agreed between the UK government and the Sultan of Turkey in 1880).

Wyndham was promoted to be Minister Resident to the King of Serbia in 1885 and upgraded to Envoy Extraordinary and Minister Plenipotentiary in the following year. In 1888 he was moved to be minister to Brazil and remained there until mid-1894. During this period he witnessed a bloodless military coup in November 1889 that overthrew the Empire of Brazil, exiled the last Emperor, Pedro II and established a republic. However, British citizens and property in Brazil were not at risk and although Britain did not yet recognise the new republic, Wyndham remained in Rio de Janeiro maintaining unofficial relations with the new government until December 1890 when he returned to England on "leave of absence" until May 1891 when the UK government established full diplomatic relations with the provisional government of the United States of Brazil. Wyndham was still at Rio when the second Brazilian Naval Revolt broke out in September 1893. During the six-month revolt Wyndham and the US ambassador, Thomas L. Thompson, generally maintained British and American neutrality although the presence of Royal Navy and US Navy warships prevented the rebels from achieving a blockade of Rio harbour.

In September 1894 Wyndham was given his final appointment as Minister to Romania at Bucharest. He retired from the Diplomatic Service in 1897 and returned to his family's estate at Rogate, Sussex, where among other things he was a Justice of the Peace, and died there in 1916.

Hugh Wyndham was appointed CB in 1878 for his services in Athens during the Russo-Turkish War (1877–1878) and knighted KCMG in 1894 for his work in Brazil.

Diplomatic posts
Preceded by Sidney Locock	Minister Resident to the King of Servia, later Envoy Extraordinary and Minister Plenipotentiary to His Majesty the King of Servia; 1885–1888	Succeeded by Frederick Robert St John
Preceded by Hugh MacDonell	Envoy Extraordinary and Minister Plenipotentiary to the Emperor of Brazil, later Envoy Extraordinary and Minister Plenipotentiary to the United States of Brazil; 1888–1894	Succeeded by Constantine Phipps
Preceded by Sir John Walsham, 2nd Baronet	Envoy Extraordinary and Minister Plenipotentiary to His Majesty the King of Roumania; 1894–1897	Succeeded by John Kennedy

== Family ==
Hugh Wyndham was a son of Charles Wyndham, an illegitimate son of George Wyndham, 3rd Earl of Egremont. In 1863 Hugh Wyndham married his cousin, Charlotte Scott. Their elder son Percy Charles Hugh Wyndham became a diplomat, minister and knight in his turn.
