= Goshen Reservoir =

Reservoir in the state of Utah, United States

- Location within Utah Location within the United States
- Location: Utah County, Utah, United States
- Coordinates: 39°56′49″N 111°56′05″W
- Type: reservoir
- Primary inflows: Currant Creek
- Primary outflows: Currant Creek
- Basin countries: United States
- Surface elevation: 4,580 ft (1,396 m)

Goshen Reservoir is a small reservoir located in Utah County, Utah. It is an impoundment of Currant Creek downstream from Mona Reservoir. It is owned and maintained by the Goshen Irrigation Co.
