= Hermione Baddeley =

English actress (1906–1986)

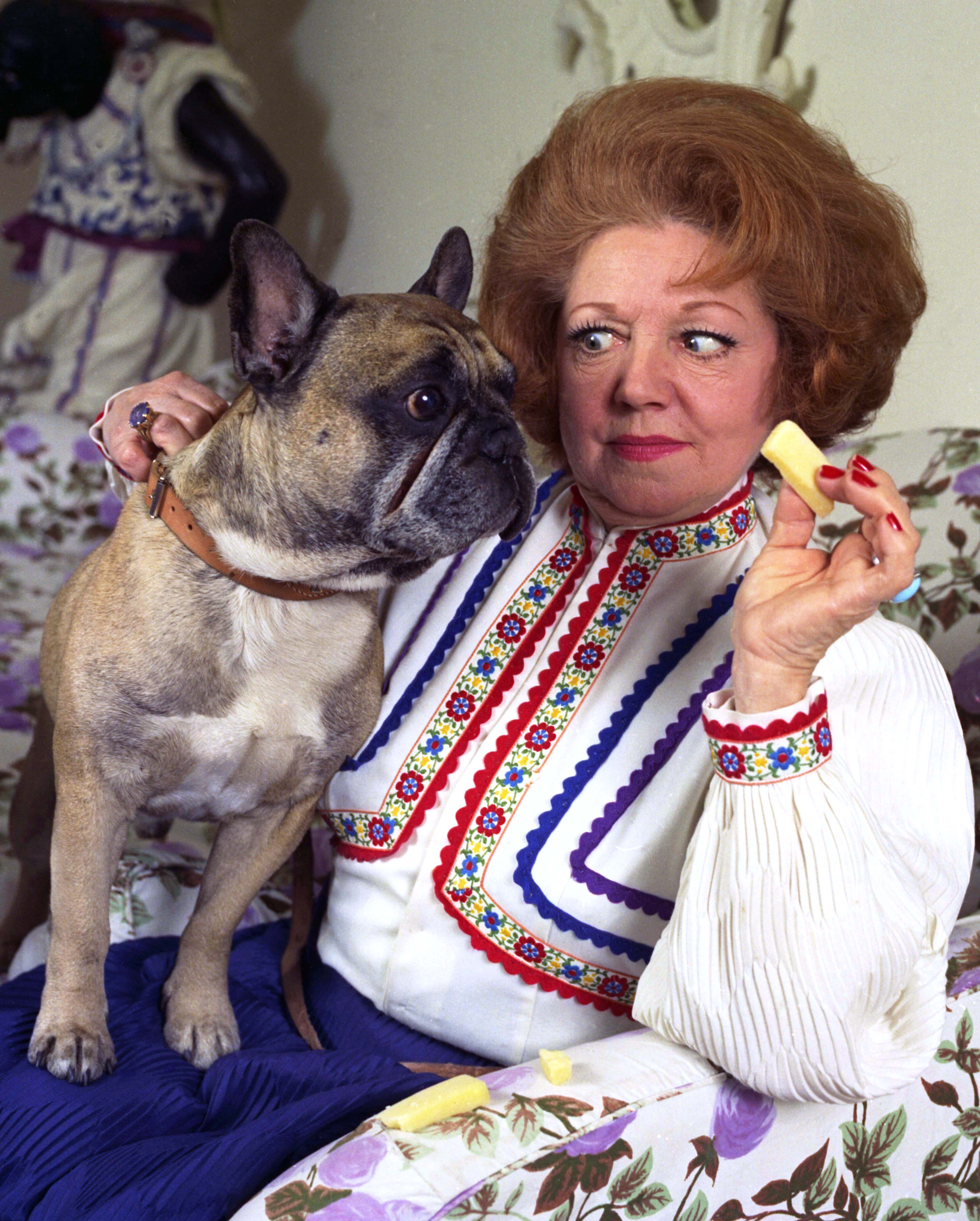
- Baddeley in the 1970s with her French Bulldog
- Born: Hermione Youlanda Ruby Clinton-Baddeley; 13 November 1906; Broseley, Shropshire, England
- Died: 19 August 1986 (aged 79); Los Angeles, California, U.S.
- Occupation: Actress
- Years active: 1918–1985
- Spouses: David Pax Tennant (m. 1928; div. 1937) John Henry Willis (m. 1940; div. 1946)
- Children: 2, including Pauline Tennant

Hermione Youlanda Ruby Clinton-Baddeley (13 November 1906 – 19 August 1986) was an English actress of theatre, film, and television. She typically played brash, vulgar characters, often referred to as "brassy" or "blowsy". She found her milieu in revue, in which she played from the 1930s to the 1950s, co-starring several times with English actress Hermione Gingold.

Baddeley was nominated for an Academy Award for Best Supporting Actress and BAFTA Award for Best British Actress for her performance in Room at the Top (1959) and a Tony Award for Best Performance by a Leading Actress in a Play for The Milk Train Doesn't Stop Here Anymore in 1963. She portrayed Mrs. Cratchit in the 1951 film Scrooge and Ellen the Maid in the 1964 Disney film Mary Poppins. She voiced Madame Adelaide Bonfamille in the 1970 Disney animated film, The Aristocats. In 1975, she won a Golden Globe Award for Best Supporting Actress in a Television Series for her portrayal of Nell Naugatuck on the TV series Maude.

== Early life ==
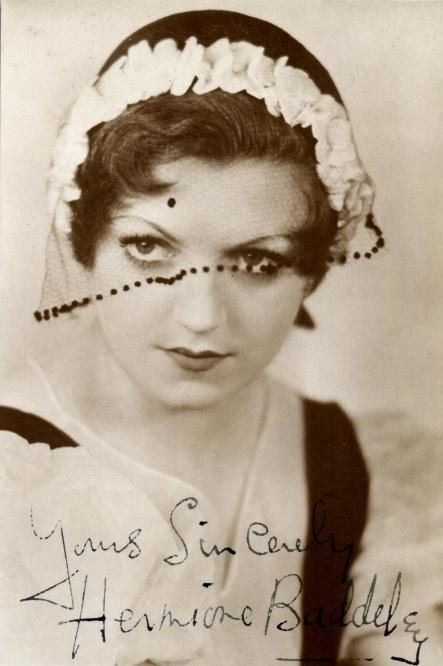
Baddeley in the 1920s

Baddeley was born in Broseley, Shropshire, to the composer William Herman Clinton-Baddeley (1867–1929) and Louise Bourdin, who was French. Baddeley was a descendant of British General Sir Henry Clinton, who served in the American War of Independence. Her elder sister, Angela Baddeley, was also an actress. Her half-brother, William Baddeley, was a Church of England clergyman who became Dean of Brisbane and Rural Dean of Westminster. Her cousin was the playwright V.C. Clinton-Baddeley.

An early stage appearance came in 1923 when she appeared in Charles McEvoy's play The Likes of Her in London's West End.

== Career ==
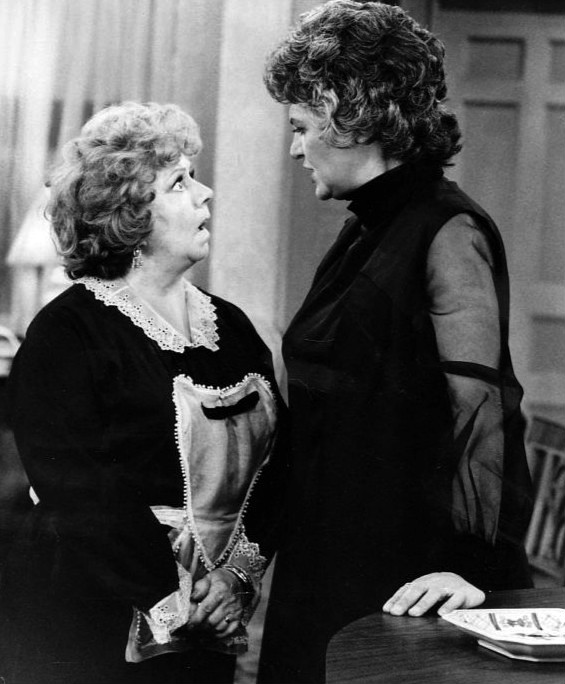
Baddeley (left) as Mrs Naugatuck in Maude, with Bea Arthur

Baddeley was known for supporting performances in such films as Passport to Pimlico (1949), Tom Brown's Schooldays and Scrooge (both 1951), The Pickwick Papers (1952), The Belles of St Trinian's (1954), Mary Poppins (as Ellen, the maidservant), and The Unsinkable Molly Brown (both 1964), although she first began making films in the 1920s. One of her more important roles was in Brighton Rock (1948), in which she played Ida, one of the main characters, whose personal investigation into the disappearance of a friend threatens the anti-hero Pinkie.

Baddeley also had numerous stage credits. She had a long professional relationship with Noël Coward, appearing in many of his plays throughout the 1940s and 1950s. The most successful was her teaming with Hermione Gingold in Coward's comedy Fallen Angels, though the two women were reportedly "no longer on speaking terms" by the end of the run. Baddeley was nominated for an Academy Award for Best Supporting Actress for her portrayal of Simone Signoret's best friend in Jack Clayton's Room at the Top (1959). With 2 minutes and 19 seconds of screen time, her role is the shortest ever to be nominated for an Academy Award. In 1960 she played prostitute Doll Tearsheet in the BBC's series of Shakespeare history plays An Age of Kings, acting alongside her sister Angela as Mistress Quickly. In 1963, she was nominated for Broadway's Tony Award as Best Actress (Dramatic) for The Milk Train Doesn't Stop Here Anymore.

She was known to American audiences for roles in Bewitched, The Cara Williams Show, Camp Runamuck, Batman, Wonder Woman, $weepstake$, Little House on the Prairie, and Maude (playing the title character's second housekeeper, Nell Naugatuck). Toward the end of her career, Baddeley was also a voice-over actress, including roles in The Aristocats (1970) and The Secret of NIMH (1982).

In January 1973, Baddeley appeared at the Royal Shakespeare Theatre, Stratford-upon-Avon, in Mother Adam by Charles Dyer, as a crippled mother living with her middle-aged museum attendant son, Adam, played by Peter Wyngarde.

== Personal life ==
In 1928 Baddeley married English aristocrat and socialite David Tennant (third son of Edward Tennant, 1st Baron Glenconner). She arrived an hour late for the wedding, having misremembered the time booked for the ceremony. They rented Teffont Evias Manor in Wiltshire, which became known for their boisterous parties that sometimes involved mixed naked bathing in the goldfish pond. She had a daughter, Pauline Laetitia Tennant (6 February 1927 – 6 December 2008) and a son, David (1930-2024); the couple divorced in 1937 but remained good friends.

In 1940 Baddeley married Major John Henry ("Dozey") Willis, of the 12th Lancers, son of Major-General Edward Willis, Lieutenant Governor of Jersey. They divorced in 1946. She had a relatively brief relationship with actor Laurence Harvey, 22 years her junior. Although Harvey proposed marriage, Baddeley thought the age difference was too great and declined.

In her memoir This Much Is True, actress Miriam Margolyes, who is openly lesbian, wrote that Baddeley was a closeted lesbian and that socialite Lady Joan Ashton-Smith was her partner. Margolyes and Baddeley appeared together in the 1972 West End production of The Threepenny Opera.

Baddeley was known for her devotion to animals. She dedicated her autobiography, The Unsinkable Hermione Baddeley, to her pet dog. She continued to work in film and television until shortly before her death.

She died on 19 August 1986, aged 79, at Cedars-Sinai Medical Center in Los Angeles following a series of strokes. Her remains were repatriated to the United Kingdom for burial.

== Filmography ==
- A Daughter in Revolt (1927) as Calamity Kate
- The Guns of Loos (1928) as Mavis
- Caste (1930) as Polly Eccles
- Royal Cavalcade (1935) as Barmaid
- Kipps (1941) as Miss Mergle
- It Always Rains on Sunday (1947) as Mrs. Spry
- Brighton Rock (1948) as Ida Arnold
- No Room at the Inn (1948) as Mrs. Waters
- Quartet (1948) as Beatrice Sunbury (segment "The Kite")
- Passport to Pimlico (1949) as Edie Randall
- Dear Mr. Prohack (1949) as Eve Prohack
- The Woman in Question (1950) as Mrs. Finch
- Hell Is Sold Out (1951) as Mme. Louise Menstrier
- There Is Another Sun (1951) as Sarah
- Scrooge (1951) as Mrs. Cratchit
- Tom Brown's Schooldays (1951) as Sally Harrowell
- Song of Paris (1952) as Mrs. Ibbetson
- Time Gentlemen, Please! (1952) as Emma Stebbins
- The Pickwick Papers (1952) as Mrs. Bardell
- Cosh Boy (1953) as Mrs. Collins
- Counterspy (1953) as Madame Del Mar
- The Belles of St. Trinian's (1954) as Miss Drownder
- Women Without Men (U.S.title Blonde Bait) (1956) as Grace
- Room at the Top (1959) as Elspeth
- Jet Storm (1959) as Mrs. Satterly
- Expresso Bongo (1959) as Penelope
- Let's Get Married (1960) as Mrs. O'Grady
- Midnight Lace (1960) as Dora Hammer
- Rag Doll (1961) as Princess
- Information Received (1961) as Maudie
- The Unsinkable Molly Brown (1964) as Buttercup Grogan
- Mary Poppins (1964) as Ellen, The Domestic
- Harlow (1965) as Marie Dressler
- Marriage on the Rocks (1965) as Jeannie MacPherson
- Do Not Disturb (1965) as Vanessa Courtwright
- The Adventures of Bullwhip Griffin (1967) as Miss Irene Chesney
- The Happiest Millionaire (1967) as Mrs. Worth
- The Aristocats (1970) as Madame Adelaide Bonfamille (voice)
- Up the Front (1972) as Monique
- The Black Windmill (1974) as Hetty
- C.H.O.M.P.S. (1979) as Mrs. Flower
- There Goes the Bride (1980) as Daphne Drimond
- The Secret of NIMH (1982) as Auntie Shrew (voice)

== Awards and nominations ==
Year	Award	Category	Nominated work	Result
1959	BAFTA Awards	Best British Actress	Room at the Top	Nominated
1960	Academy Awards	Best Supporting Actress	Room at the Top	Nominated
1963	Tony Awards	Best Actress in a Play	The Milk Train Doesn't Stop Here Anymore	Nominated
1976	Golden Globe Awards	Best Supporting Actress - Television	Maude	Won

== See also ==
- List of Academy Award records
