= Sir Edward Goschen, 1st Baronet =

British diplomat

The Right Honourable Sir Edward Goschen GCB GCMG GCVO PC
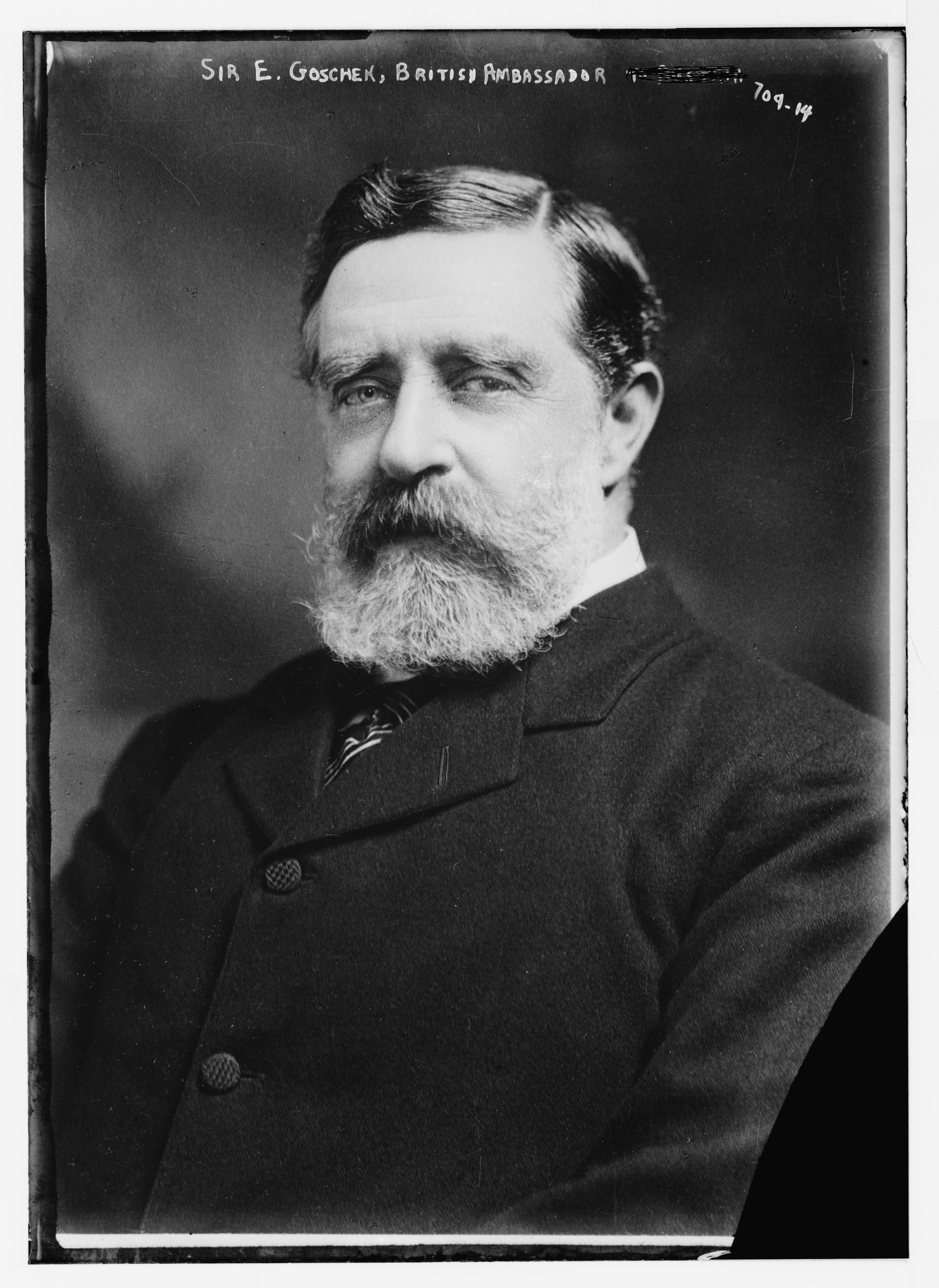

British Ambassador to Germany
- In office 1908–1914
- Preceded by: Sir Frank Lascelles
- Succeeded by: Post suspended

British Ambassador to Austria-Hungary
- In office 1905–1908
- Preceded by: Sir Francis Plunkett
- Succeeded by: Sir Fairfax Cartwright

British Ambassador to Denmark
- In office 1900–1905
- Preceded by: Sir Edmund Fane
- Succeeded by: Hon. Sir Alan Johnstone

British Ambassador to Serbia
- In office 1899–1900
- Preceded by: Sir Edmund Fane
- Succeeded by: Sir George Bonham

Personal details
- Born: 18 July 1847 Eltham, England
- Died: 20 May 1924 (aged 76) Chelsea, London, England
- Education: Corpus Christi College, Oxford
- Occupation: Diplomat

Sir William Edward Goschen, 1st Baronet (18 July 1847 – 20 May 1924), was a British diplomat.

== Background and education ==
Goschen was born at Eltham, England, the twelfth child and sixth son of Wilhelm Heinrich Göschen, originally of Leipzig, Saxony, and Henrietta Ohmann, who was born in London. At the time of his birth his father was 54. The Liberal Unionist politician Lord Goschen was Goschen's elder brother. He was educated at Rugby and Corpus Christi College, Oxford. He twice represented Oxford at real tennis, played five matches of first-class cricket as a right-handed batsman for the University of Oxford and throughout his life was a keen sportsman.

== Diplomatic service ==
Goschen entered the Diplomatic Service in 1869 and after an initial few months at the Foreign Office he served in Madrid, as Third Secretary in Buenos Aires, Paris, Rio de Janeiro, Constantinople, Peking, Copenhagen as secretary to the legation (1888–1890), Lisbon as secretary to the legation, Washington (1893–1894) as secretary and Saint Petersburg (1895–1898).

=== Minister to Belgrade ===
Goschen was offered the Belgrade legation and took up post in Serbia in September 1899. He was later to recall that his only instructions from the Foreign Secretary Lord Salisbury was to "keep [an] eye [on] King Milan". He remained in Serbia until 1900.

=== Minister to Copenhagen ===
According to Goschen himself he was initially less than happy to be offered the Copenhagen legation. "Oh dear, oh dear! I am not thrilled and later accepted but with misgivings". He served as Minister to Denmark from 1900 until 1905 and although recognising the posting as something of a diplomatic backwater he at least revelled in the social aspects of his position.

=== Ambassador to Vienna ===
Goschen's appointment as Ambassador to Austria-Hungary was seemingly made at the behest of King Edward VII. Goschen most probably expected the Vienna posting to be his last but the imminent retirement of Sir Frank Lascelles at the Berlin embassy posed problems for the Foreign Secretary.

=== Ambassador to Berlin ===
Finding a successor for Lascelles was not easy. Berlin made it clear that Sir Arthur Nicolson would be unacceptable as the successor and although the Permanent Under-Secretary for Foreign Affairs Charles Hardinge had initially favoured Fairfax Cartwright, the Minister at Munich, he was in his turn vetoed by the Germans who wanted a public figure. Eventually a reluctant Kaiser was persuaded to accept Goschen. In Goschen's last conversation with the German Chancellor Theobald von Bethmann Hollweg before asking for his passports, on 4 August 1914, Bethmann famously expressed his astonishment that England would go to war for "a scrap of paper" (the 1839 treaty guaranteeing Belgium's neutrality).

== Sir Edward Goschen Fund ==
During World War I, Goschen established a relief fund for British citizens still living in Germany who had lost their means of income and for British POWs being held prisoner in Germany. The fund was primarily administered through the United States Consular Service, now the United States Foreign Service.

== Honours ==
British honours and decorations

- GCB: Knight Grand Cross of the Order of the Bath – 19 June 1911
- GCMG: Knight Grand Cross of the Order of St Michael and St George – 25 June 1909
  - KCMG: Knight Commander of the Order of St Michael and St George – 13 September 1901 – during a private visit to Denmark by King Edward VII and Queen Alexandra
- GCVO: Knight Grand Cross of the Royal Victorian Order – 8 September 1905
  - KCVO: Knight Commander of the Royal Victorian Order - 18 April 1904
- Goschen was admitted to the Privy Council in 29 May 1905
- He was created a Baronet, of Beacon Lodge, in the parish of Highcliffe, in the County of Southampton, on 17 January 1916.

Foreign decorations

- Denmark: Grand Cross of the Order of Dannebrog
- Austrian Empire: Grand Cross of the Order of Leopold
- Prussia: Grand Cross of the Order of the Red Eagle

== Personal life ==
Goschen married Harriet Hosta Clarke, an American from Michigan, in 1874. They had two sons, Edward Henry Goschen, born in 1877, and George Gerard Goschen, born in 1887. Lady Goschen died in February 1912. In later life he became an enthusiastic if untalented violinist. He notes in his diary playing duets with the German Crown Prince in 1910. Goschen died in Chelsea, London, in May 1924, aged 76, and was succeeded in his title by his eldest son, Edward Henry Goschen.

Diplomatic posts
Preceded by Sir Edmund Fane	British Minister to Serbia; 1899–1900	Succeeded by Sir George Bonham
Preceded by Sir Edmund Fane	British Minister to Denmark; 1900–1905	Succeeded by Hon. Sir Alan Johnstone
Preceded by Sir Francis Plunkett	British Ambassador to Austria-Hungary; 1905–1908	Succeeded by Sir Fairfax Cartwright
Preceded by Sir Frank Lascelles	British Ambassador to Germany; 1908–1914	World War I
Court offices
Vacant Title last held by Sir Spencer Ponsonby-Fane	Gentleman Usher to the Sword of State; 1919–1924	Succeeded by Sir Reginald Brade
Baronetage of the United Kingdom
New creation	Baronet of Beacon Lodge; 1916–1924	Succeeded by Edward Goschen
