= Gargoyle Club =

Private club in Soho, London

Coordinates: 51.513338°N 0.132554°W

Gargoyle Club, 1940

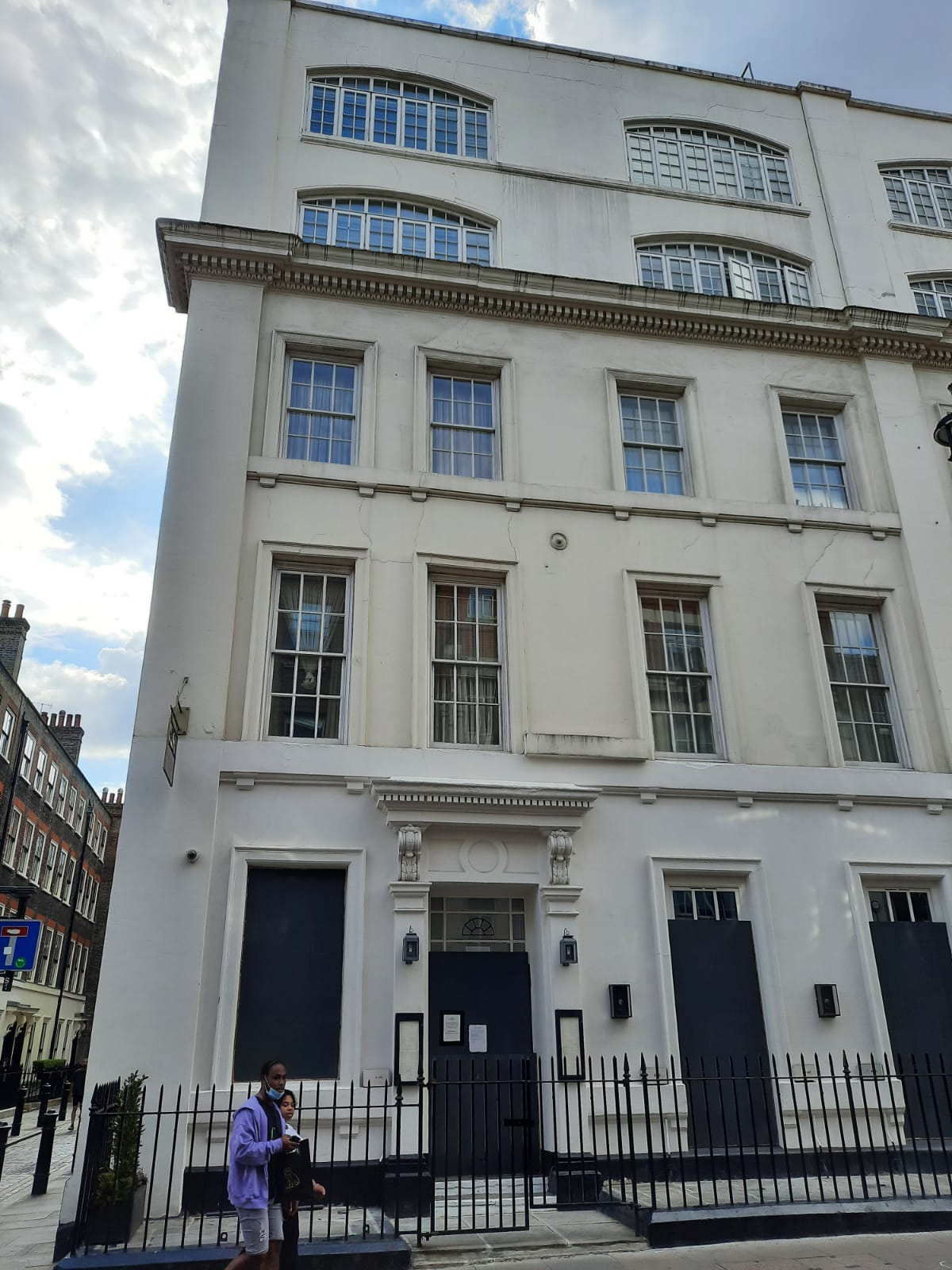
69 Dean Street in Soho, in which the Gargoyle Club was located

The Gargoyle Club was a private club on the upper floors of 69 Dean Street, Soho, London, at the corner with Meard Street. It was founded on 16 January 1925 by the aristocratic socialite David Tennant, son of the First Baron Glenconner. David was the brother of Stephen Tennant who was a prominent member of the social set called "Bright Young People" and of Edward Tennant, the poet who was killed in action in World War I.

== Before Tennant ==
This elegant house, 69 and 70 Dean Street, a pair of Georgian residences, was built on the Pitt estate in 1732–1735 by John Meard, the carpenter who helped standardise the Georgian town house.

- Later occupants of No. 70 included :

- Sir William Wolseley, 5th Baronet, 1734–5
- Robert Marsham, second Baron Romney, 1736–40
- Sir Thomas Wilson, knight and 'agent', 1761–74).

- Later occupants of No. 69 included :

- George Wandesford, 4th Viscount Castlecomer (1687–1751), in 1750;
- Sir John Wynn, 2nd Baronet, 1755–73
- Baron Grant in 1775;
- Sir Lionel Darell, 1st Baronet, 1775–95
- (Sir) Thomas Bell, 1796–1824

"In 1834 No. 69 was taken by Vincent Novello, the composer and musical editor, and his son, Joseph Alfred, music seller and publisher, who were perhaps responsible for the erection of the back premises, with the wall still fronting Meard Street. Vincent's daughter, Clara, the singer, was also living here in 1840 and the painter, J. P. Davis, in 1842. In 1847 the firm of Novello became music printers also. It was probably in 1864–5 that the upper storeys were added to No. 69 to accommodate the printing works. In 1867 the firm removed to Berners Street but in 1871 the printing works returned to No. 69, and No. 70 was bought in 1875 for the storage of plates. Thenceforward the firm occupied both houses until 1898, when it moved to new printing works in Hollen Street."
Survey of London

== David Tennant ==
David Tennant took a 50-year lease on the upper three floors. An existing printing works established by the Novello music publishing family remained housed beneath. Here he created a private apartment, a very large ballroom, a Tudor Room, coffee room, drawing room and a 350-sq yds flat roof with a garden for dining and dancing, around which neighbouring chimneys were painted red. Those who visited the club shared its rickety external lift, four-person maximum, enclosed in metal like an art-nouveau cabin trunk, located round the corner in Meard Street.

The charismatic Tennant was the self-appointed ringmaster to an arena where Bohemians could mingle comfortably with the upper crust, according to writer and film producer Michael Luke.

Of the club's opening night The Daily Telegraph observed that its 300-strong list of members "probably contains more famous names in society and the arts than any other purely social club". Names on this list included Somerset Maugham, Noël Coward, Gladys Cooper, Leon Goossens, Gordon Craig, George Grossmith, Virginia Woolf, Duncan Grant, Nancy Cunard, Adèle Astaire, Edwina Mountbatten; an obligatory Guinness, Rothschild and Sitwell; MPs, and peers of the realm.

== Decor ==
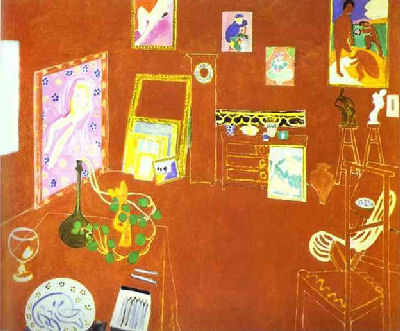
L'Atelier Rouge, Henri Matisse, 1911, oil on canvas, 162 x 130 cm., (64 in × 51 in), The Museum of Modern Art, New York City. Acquired through the Lillie P. Bliss Bequest

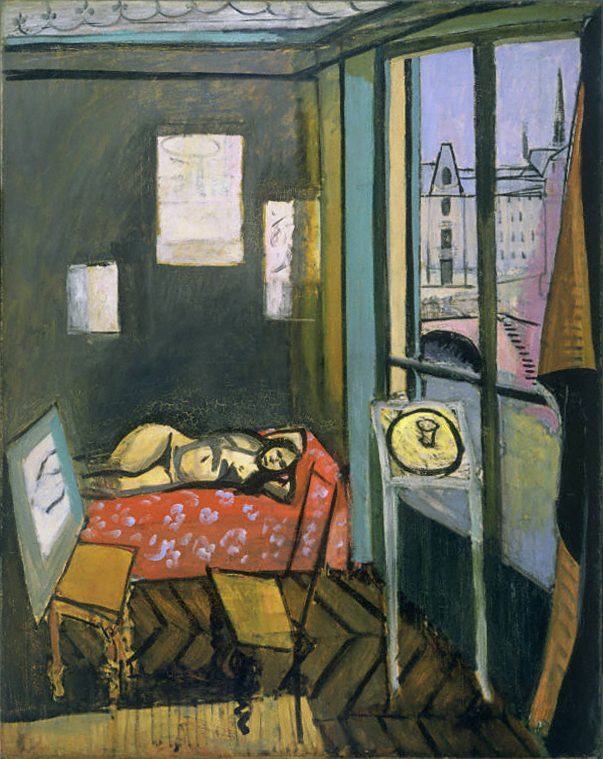
Studio, Quai Saint-Michel, Henri Matisse, 1916, oil on canvas, 147.9 x 116.8 cm., (? in × ? in), The Phillips Collection, Washington D.C.

Designed by Henri Matisse, Edwin Lutyens, and Augustus John, the interior decor was theatrical – a fountain on the dance floor, log fires in the dining room, wooden gargoyles suspended as lanterns – with a strong Moorish flavour. Henri Matisse was made an honorary member after advising on decor. To complement the main club-room's elaborate coffered ceiling painted with gold leaf, like the Alhambra, he suggested covering the walls entirely with a mosaic of imperfectly cut glass tiles from an 18th-century chateau. Matisse himself designed a stunning entrance staircase to this room in glittering steel and brass, which remained in use until the club's conversion into a studio complex in the mid-1980s.

The young Tennant bought two of Matisse's paintings in Paris for £600 and in the opinion of Anthony Powell they "lent an air of go-ahead culture to the club". These were the painter's daring and inventive The Red Studio from 1911 which was displayed in the bar at the Gargoyle until 1941, offered to the Tate Gallery for £400 and declined, then in 1949 joined the MoMA permanent collection in New York where it still hangs.

he other Matisse, The Studio, Quai St Michel (1916), features his favourite model the voluptuous Lorette, naked on a couch, on the club's stairs. Today she resides in Washington DC in The Phillips Collection, after Tennant, feeling himself to be on the verge of ruin, sold it for "a derisory sum" to Douglas Cooper, who in turn sold it on.

"The decor is bright but tasteful and Matisse gave his expert advice. Several of his drawings of ballet girls grace the upstairs bar which is a cheerful spot always crowded with people discussing art, politics or women in the liveliest way. ‘My unpaid cabaret,’ David Tennant calls them… The restaurant downstairs seats 140 and its ceiling and general design have been modelled on the Alhambra at Granada. The mirrors are particularly attractive, unless you have drunk too much gin!... The four-piece band led by Alec Alexander, suits the style of the club. It delivers lively, cheerful music that you can dance to without having your nerves torn to shreds. Alec knows all the members and seems to enjoy playing requests." – Stanley Jackson, 1946

== After Tennant ==
In 1952, David Tennant sold the Gargoyle as a declining concern for £5,000 to caterer John Negus and it remained popular among the generation of Francis Bacon, Antonia Fraser and Daniel Farson who would often go on from the Colony Room, which was founded in 1948 by Muriel Belcher across at 41 Dean Street. For years the Gargoyle was one of the few places in London serving drinks at affordable prices after midnight. In 1955, the club was sold on to Michael Klinger and Jimmy Jacobs who relaunched it as a strip club called the Nell Gwynne, variously advertised as a Theatre, Club, or Revue. A 1960s ad shows the club as the Nell Gwynne by day and the Gargoyle Club at night.

On 19 May 1979, in the Gargoyle's rooftop club space Hammersmith-born insurance salesman Peter Rosengard started a weekly club night on Saturdays called the Comedy Store, in partnership with comedian Don Ward. It was modelled on the original in Los Angeles, and invited audiences to show approval or disapproval of the unknown acts performing by "gonging" them off.

The London Comedy Store made the reputations of many of the UK's upcoming "alternative comedians". Among the original line-up here were Alexei Sayle, Rik Mayall, Adrian Edmondson, French & Saunders, Nigel Planer and Peter Richardson who in 1980 led these pioneers to establish the breakaway Comic Strip team elsewhere in Soho. All were to prove influential in reshaping British television comedy throughout the 1980s as stars of The Comic Strip Presents.

In July 1982, among many themed weekly club-nights, came the first incarnation upstairs in the Gargoyle Club of the Batcave, a Wednesday night fronted by Olli Wisdom, lead singer in the house band, Specimen, and guitarist Jon Klein as art director. Visitors included Robert Smith, Siouxsie Sioux, Steve Severin, Foetus, Marc Almond and Nick Cave. The Nell Gwynne strip-teasers were still performing from 2.30 pm until late evening, when they could be seen exiting via the rickety lift, even as Batcavers queued to come up.

By the year's end, when the upper floors were sold off, the one-nighters such as Batcave moved on. The Comedy Store moved to a series of other venues, taking over 28a Leicester Square (previously the Subway club) in 1985. It had become a template for the new style of stand-up comedy clubs that opened around the land. Don Ward dissolved his business relationship with Rosengard in late 1981 while remaining CEO of Comedy Store interests. In 1984 Rosengard went on to manage the band Curiosity Killed the Cat.

== The Mandrake ==
In the postwar 1940s, a second private club became part of the story of 69 Dean Street, when an eccentric crowd started gathering in the Mandrake at No 4 Meard Street, a house only a few yards west of the Gargoyle's entrance with its tiny lift. An underground room was rented for a chess club by streetwise Teddy Turner and Bulgarian émigré Boris Watson, after a name change.

In 1953, the basement beneath Meard Street became six rooms, after knocking through walls underneath No 69, to include a reading room for the intellectuals. An advert claimed the Mandrake to be "London's only Bohemian rendezvous". A year's membership cost half a guinea “in advance” and the bait was illustrated with a photograph of an artist sketching beside an image of a voluptuous nude. Pretty soon the offbeat broadcaster Daniel Farson was calling its barmaid Ruth Soho's equivalent of Manet's famous Suzon painted serving at A Bar at the Folies Bergère.

Regulars included Nina Hamnett, Brian Howard and Julian Maclaren-Ross for whom Watson would cash cheques in the form of credit behind the bar. Private membership clubs were allowed to stay open during the strict afternoon closing hours imposed on pubs by the licensing laws, and late into the early hours after the 10.30 pm closing time for pubs. One condition was that clubs were required to serve food with alcohol. Result: the Mandrake became notorious for its stale sandwiches piled behind the bar, in Watson's view available “for drinking with, not for eating!”.

Inevitably the drinkers grew to outnumber the thinkers. Soon a jukebox made its appearance along with live guitar and lute recitals, and impromptu jam sessions for jazz musicians such as pianist Joe Burns, bassists Wally Wrightman and Percy Borthwick, drummers Laurie Morgan and Robin Jones, trombonist Norman Cave, singer Cab Kaye and Ronnie Scott (later founder of Soho's pre-eminent jazz club), plus visitors such as the touring Duke Ellington band. The 1960s brought in the legendary painters and poets who were reinforcing Soho's reputation for general non-conformity. The kitchen was forced to upgrade and, according to Michael Luke, the Mandrake became "a launching pad for the Gargoyle – a place where loins could be girded and spirits stiffened for that challenging arena up above".

In the 1970s, the Mandrake acquired a new pedimented entrance door on Meard Street, curiously now east of the Gargoyle's, just a couple of yards nearer to Dean Street. Its lease was then acquired by Soho's only Jamaican club owner, Vince Howard, who changed its name to Billy's. Vince Howard in the cover story of The Face magazine in February 1983 was described as "a Soho legend himself, straight out of Shaft, huge hats, fistfuls of rings and the only black man to own a venue in Soho." The publication also quoted his jeweller describing a mountainous ring he was making for the glamorous club owner: “18‑carat gold, 16 diamonds, it shone like a torch. I showed it to Vince and he said, I want more diamonds on it.” Howard spent some time trying to identify an audience, first with soul music, and then becoming a blatantly gay venue in those early days following liberation.

“A rather seedy gay club frequented by rough lesbians and even rougher trannies... It was owned by a 300-pound six-foot-four black convicted pimp named Vince who sported a huge black fedora, a long leather coat, and fingers the size of sausages with enough diamond rings to give Imelda Marcos cause for concern. And lest we forget, in those days Soho was not full of posh restaurants and membership clubs; it was a vice-infested square mile that housed a red light above every door and on every floor." – Chris Sullivan on Billy’s in his book, We Can Be Heroes (2012).

Billy's changed its name to Gossip's and became part of London's clubbing heritage by spawning scores of weekly club-nights that transformed Britain's music and fashion scene during the 1980s, crucially a Bowie night run by Steve Strange and Rusty Egan who teamed up at Billy's in 1978 and went on to open the hugely influential Blitz Club which kick-started the New Romantics movement.

== Reconstruction ==
In the 1970s, the ground floor at No 69 was occupied by A. Stewart McCracken Ltd Auction Rooms and at No 70 was the Hostaria Romana restaurant. More recently, 69–70 Dean Street became a bar in The Pitcher and Piano chain and the pair of houses became Listed Grade II. In the run-up to their rebirth in 2008, the interiors of numbers 69 and 70 were completely rebuilt by Soho House to create the Dean Street Townhouse hotel and restaurant.

In 2016, Prince Harry and Meghan Markle's first date took place at the Dean Street Dining Room in the Dean Street Townhouse.

== Notable members of Tennant's club ==
An extensive hand-written list of members is illustrated in Michael Luke's Gargoyle Years, between pages 84–85.

- Max Abrams, drummer, house band.
- Fred Astaire
- Francis Bacon (artist)
- Hermione Baddeley
- Tallulah Bankhead
- Lady Caroline Blackwood
- Guy Burgess
- Noël Coward
- Lucian Freud
- Graham Greene
- Augustus John
- Robert Kee
- Donald Maclean
- Henri Matisse
- John Minton
- Lee Miller
- Ivan Moffat
- Henrietta Moraes
- Dylan Thomas
- Philip Toynbee
