= Jim Barclay (comedian) =

English actor and comedian

Jim Barclay (born 23 May 1947) is an English actor and comedian, who played the title role of Jossy Blair in the BBC TV series Jossy's Giants. He was also part of the early British alternative comedy movement in the 1980s.

== Early life ==
Barclay was born in South Shields but brought up in South East London, the son of a deputy headmaster. He went to comprehensive school in 1958, where he started acting in school plays and was encouraged by his drama teacher to join the National Youth Theatre. He went on to study at the New College of Speech and Drama.

== Career ==
=== Theatre ===
Barclay started his career working in Theatre-in-Education, starting in 1969 at the Newcastle Playhouse Regional Extension Unit. He went on to work with left-wing alternative theatre groups, notably 7:84 and Mayday Theatre, where he met Tony Allen. Barclay's disillusionment with traditional anti-establishment arts - "there must be a more honest, less patronizing way of getting ideas across to people" – led him to move to political comedy. After his involvement with alternative comedy, he returned to theatre acting in the late 1980s, spending three years with the National Theatre. In 2014, he starred as Scrooge in the Derby Theatre's production of A Christmas Carol.

=== Comedy ===
Encouraged by Tony Allen, Barclay began performing comedy in the early days of the London Comedy Store. By 1981, Barclay was compering shows at the Comedy Store, an article from The Sun noting his skill in this role: "Jim is a pro. They don't muck about with him, even at The Comedy Store." Along with Alexei Sayle, Andy de la Tour and others, he was one of a group of comedians who formed the politically charged comedy group Alternative Cabaret, which staged shows at the Elgin pub in Ladbroke Grove in 1979–80, and in gigs around London and beyond. Tony Allen has described how he, Barclay and Andy de la Tour supported each other in developing their respective stand-up acts: "All three of us were struggling to understand what we were doing and we gave each other valuable feedback and helped nurse each other's wounds." Barclay appeared in Alternative Cabaret's 1981 show at the Edinburgh Fringe, and a recording of his act appears on the Alternative Cabaret LP. In 1984, he devised an anti-nuclear one-man show called Four Minutes to Midnight, which he performed at the Edinburgh Fringe and elsewhere, being one of the first of the new generation of alternative comedians to take a full-length solo production to the Edinburgh Fringe, pioneering a style of theme-based show taken up by comedians in the decades that followed.

Barclay's style on stage was both highly political and ridiculous, exploring the absurdity of using comedy to promote radical change while at the same time being part of the general "alternative" challenge to 1970s mainstream comedy culture. He would tell audiences, "Well, as you've gathered from what you've seen so far of my act, I'm the Marxist-Leninist comedian. And I tell jokes which precipitate the downfall of capitalist society". His act has been described as an example of how alternative comedy played with the politics of pleasure and "the boundaries between what audiences want and what they feel they should want". He evolved an "agitprop" style he described as 'wacky and zany', adopting a costume which included yellow tights, T-shirts with slogans like 'Loot British', and a hat which incorporated both a joke nail-through-the-head and deeley boppers. A review of a show at Brickies Club in Poole in January 1984 describes Barclay's act: 'All "come on", chat and cheerfully manic aggression, with his silly hat, yellow lyrics tights and massive physical presence, he seemed more like Alternative comedy's answer to Tommy Cooper.' In June 1984, Barclay appeared in three different guises in an event staged by the Labour Party at the Wembley Conference Centre called A Night for a Nuclear Free Europe. He appeared performing his own stand-up act, in character as a comic alien among the "Pre-Curtain Up and Interval Entertainers", and running an "Interval Competition" in the second interval. Following the event, Neil Kinnock, then the leader of the Labour Party, wrote a letter of thanks to Barclay, saying, "I wish to thank you for your splendid contribution to Labour's Night for a Nuclear Free Europe at Wembley...I think we have really hit on a winning formula for political entertainment which can appeal to a far larger audience than the usual political meeting."

=== Television ===
In 1986, Barclay starred in the popular BBC children's football-based drama Jossy's Giants, playing the eponymous Jossy Blair, a former child football star injured shortly after his debut for Newcastle United, now charged with coaching a local school team to greatness. Barclay also appeared on television a number of times as a comedian, notably performing his stand-up act on Book 'Em and Risk It (Channel 4, 1983), Stomping on the Cat (Channel 4, 1984), and Interference (Channel 4, 1984). As an actor, he appeared in three episodes of the seminal alternative comedy series The Young Ones: (Boring, Flood and Sick). He has appeared in several episodes of both Grange Hill and The Bill.

== Personal life ==
Barclay is the father of comedian and journalist Ellie Gibson, who is half of the double act Scummy Mummies, who perform live shows and produce The Scummy Mummies Podcast.

== Collections ==
The University of Kent holds material relating to Barclay's career as part of the British Stand-Up Comedy Archive. The collection includes audio-visual material and items relating to his social activism and politics.
