= London Noses =

Art installation in London

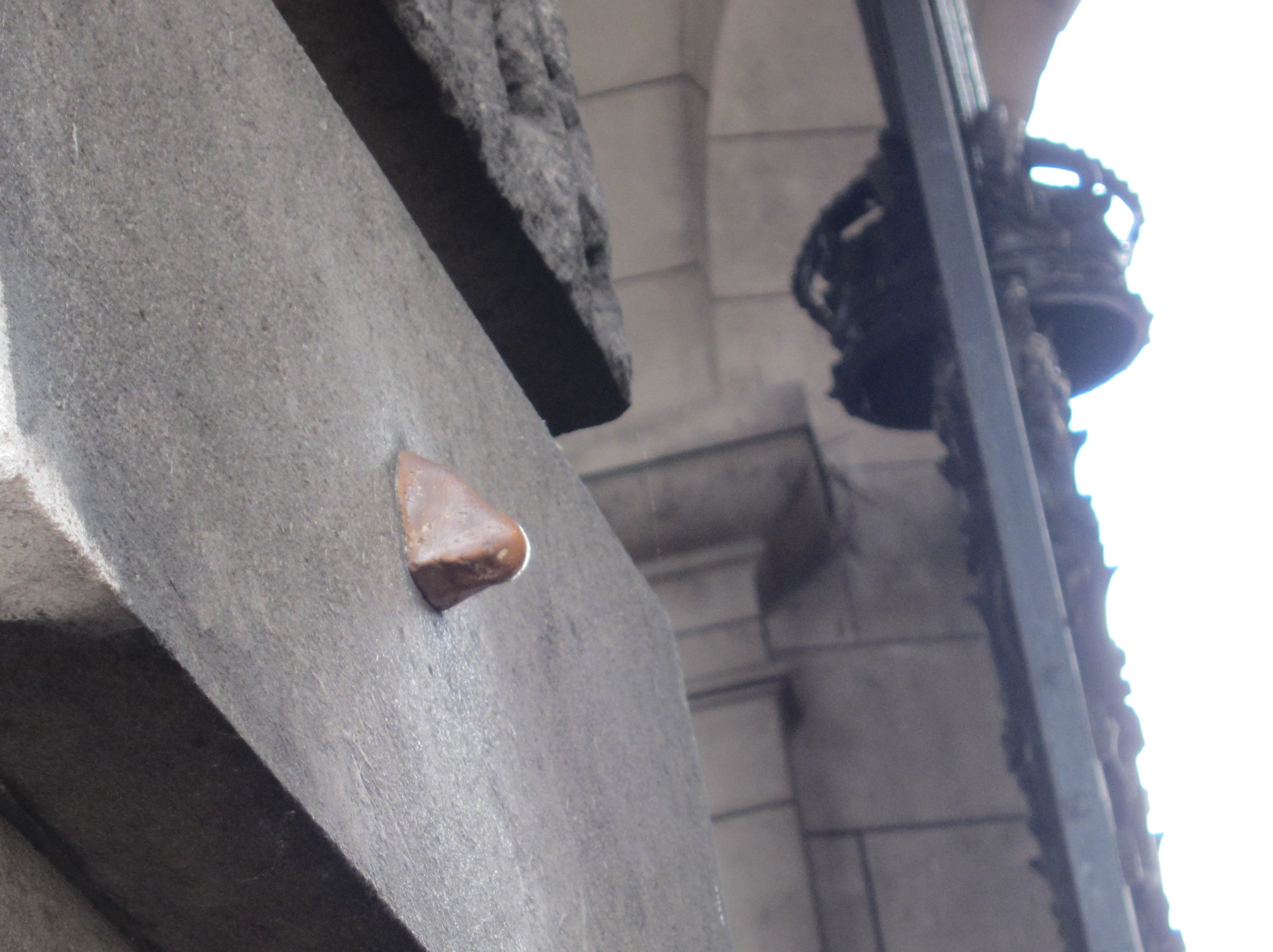
A London Nose at Admiralty Arch

The London Noses or Seven Noses of Soho are an artistic installation found on buildings in London. They are plaster of Paris reproductions of the artist's nose which protrude from walls in an incongruous and unexpected way. They were created by artist Rick Buckley in 1997. Initially, about 35 were attached to buildings such as the National Gallery and Tate Britain but by 2011 only about 10 survived.

The artist was provoked by the controversial introduction of CCTV cameras throughout London and, inspired by the Situationists, installed the noses under the noses of the cameras. The prank was not publicised and so urban myths grew up to explain the appearance of the noses. For example, the nose inside the Admiralty Arch was said to have been created to mock Napoleon and that the nose would be tweaked by cavalry troopers from nearby Horse Guards Parade when they passed through the arch. Another story told of the Seven Noses of Soho which would give great fortune to those who found them all. The noses are said to be located at Admiralty Arch, Great Windmill Street, Meard Street, Bateman Street, Dean Street, Endell Street and D'Arblay Street in Central London.

== Gallery ==
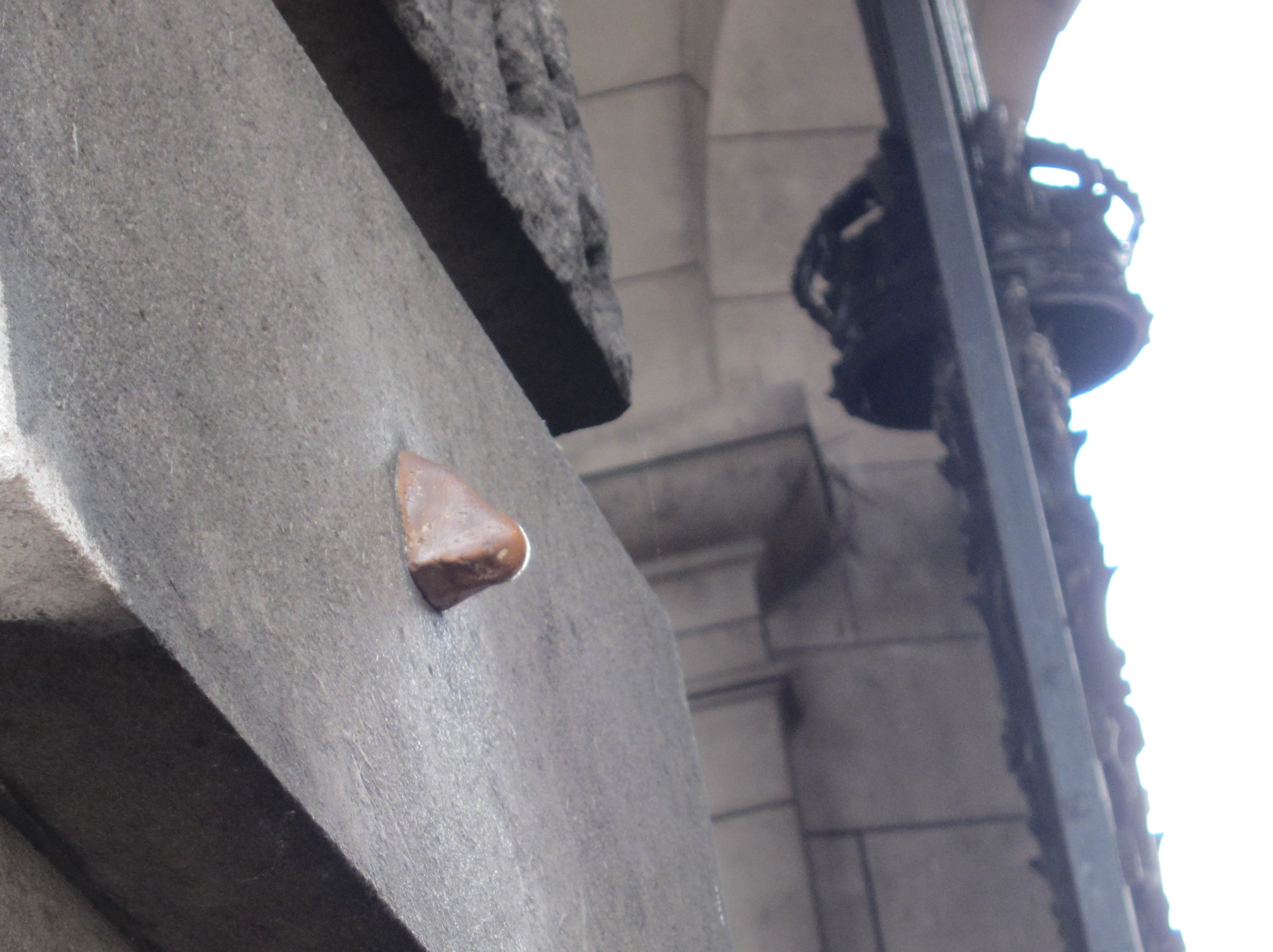
The nose at Admiralty Arch

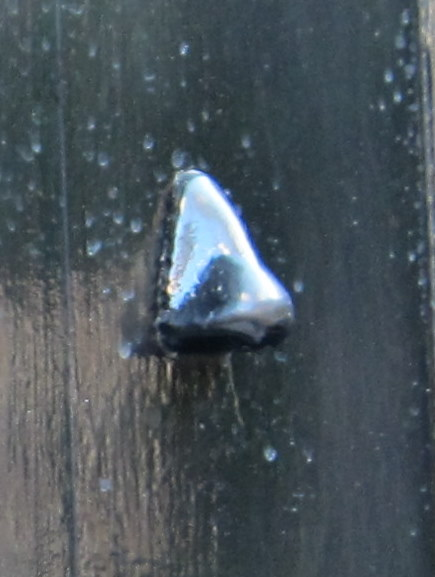
The nose in Dean Street, outside Quo Vadis

The nose formerly outside St. Pancras Renaissance London Hotel
