= Pauline Melville =

Guyanese-born writer

Pauline C Melville FRSL
- Born: England
- Education: Brunel University
- Occupations: Writer, actress, comedian
- Writing career
- Language: English
- Notable works: Shape-Shifter (1990); The Ventriloquist's Tale (1997)
- Notable awards: Commonwealth Writers' Prize; Guardian Fiction Prize; Whitbread First Novel Award; Guyana Prize for Literature

Pauline Melville FRSL (born 1946) is an English writer and former actress of mixed European and Amerindian ancestry, who is currently based in London, England. Among awards she has received for her writing – which encompasses short stories, novels and essays – are the Commonwealth Writers' Prize, the Guardian Fiction Prize, the Whitbread First Novel Award, and the Guyana Prize for Literature. Salman Rushdie has said of Melville: "I believe her to be one of the few genuinely original writers to emerge in recent years."

== Background and early career ==
Melville was born in the former colony of British Guiana (present-day Guyana), where she spent her pre-school years in the 1940s; her mother was English, and her father Guyanese of mixed race, "part South American Indian, African and Scottish".

The family moved to south London in the early 1950s, and after leaving school in the early 1960s, Melville worked at London's Royal Court Theatre, which would eventually lead to her becoming a professional actor. She first appeared in films in 1967, and in 1970–74 decided to further her education by doing a course in psychology and economics at Brunel University, then sought to combine art and politics by working with the Joint Stock Theatre Company and the Scottish theatre company 7:84. She also concerned herself with post-independence politics in Guyana and elsewhere in the Caribbean region, teaching literacy in Grenada and working at the Jamaica School of Drama, while beginning to write short stories.

As a performer, Melville was most active during the 1980s, appearing in such films as Mona Lisa (1986) and The Long Good Friday (1980), along with television roles including in the television sitcoms The Young Ones and Girls on Top.

== Stand-up comedy ==
While performing with rock cabaret group the Sadista Sisters in 1978, Melville started performing stand-up comedy pieces in which she mocked hippie attitudes. She later recalled, "And I started – and it just took off. I mean there were sounds coming from the audience as if I'd burst some enormous bubble and at one point I thought somebody was sitting on some bagpipes, because…they were laughing so much."

She went on to join the group Alternative Cabaret and become a leading figure in the early alternative comedy movement, performing stand-up mainly in the character of Edie, a northern housewife trying desperately to prove herself as a left-wing radical. Her act was featured in early TV showcases for alternative comedy, notably Boom Boom Out Go the Lights and The Entertainers. In 1981, she performed with Alternative Cabaret in one of the first stand-up shows to appear at the Edinburgh Festival Fringe, alongside Tony Allen, Andy de la Tour, Jim Barclay and the pianist Phil Nichol.

== Writing ==
According to Gadfly Online, "Much of Melville's writing is inspired by the people and events she observed while growing up in Guyana, a former British colony which didn't become independent until 1966. As a little girl and a teenager, Melville witnessed the complicated social problems of a nation locked in a desperate struggle to modernize and overcome its imperialist past. Today, an astounding number of cultures coexist in the region, in varying degrees of amicability, from European to Amerindian and African to East Indian, and the Guyanese have dealt with poverty, pollution and shortages of basic commodities, including electrical power."

Melville herself said in a 2010 interview: "Being a writer is like being a window-cleaner in a house or a castle where the windows are obscured by dirt and grime. Writing is like cleaning the windows so that people can see a view of the world they have never seen before."

As well as contributing shorter writings to literary outlets including Slightly Foxed, Electric Literature and elsewhere, Melville has published three volumes of short stories and two novel.

=== Shape-Shifter (1990) ===
Her first book, the collection of short stories Shape-Shifter, was published in 1990 and won several awards, including the Commonwealth Writers' Prize for Best First Book (for Western Hemisphere region and Overall Best-Full Commonwealth), the Guardian Fiction Prize, and the PEN/Macmillan Silver Pen Award. A number of the stories deal with post-colonial life in the Caribbean, particularly in her native Guyana, as well as of some stories being set in London. Many of her characters, most of them displaced people from former colonies struggling to come to terms with a new life in Britain, attempt to find an identity, to reconcile their past and to escape from the restlessness hinted at in the title. Salman Rushdie described the collection as "notably sharp, funny, original...part Caribbean magic, part London grime, written in a slippery, chameleon language that is a frequent delight". Other critical acclaim included a review in Publishers Weekly of "this startling debut collection" that concluded: "Melville transforms the mundane yet never loses sight of social inequities or of the pleasures of laughter."

Isobel Montgomery in a 2011 review of the paperback edition wrote: "It's not hard to see why this collection, first published in 1990, won both the Guardian and Commonwealth Writers' prize. The language is as full of surprises as Melville's characters. They are mostly from Guyana, a place 'where the ghosts walked openly and brazenly in the streets. The blue eyes of a Dutch planter looked enquiringly out of the black face of the local midwife.' ...Poverty and ill-luck abound, but the shape of this collection is essentially optimistic and energetic."

=== The Ventriloquist's Tale (1997) ===
Melville's first novel, The Ventriloquist's Tale (1997), won the Whitbread First Novel Award, the Guyana Prize for Literature, and was shortlisted for the Orange Prize for Fiction. In the book – which one reviewer characterised as "a unique look at the conflicts of ancient and modern ways" – Melville explores the nature of fiction and storytelling and writes about the impact of European colonisers on Guyanese Amerindians through the story of a brother and sister.

According to Publishers Weekly: "In Melville's ambitious and richly realized debut set in modern-day Guyana, religious, social and philosophical tensions beset all the characters. ...Melville's nuanced characterizations, fluid prose, apt imagery and beautifully understated dialogue augment her skill as a raconteur. An unsentimental but moving narrative about the pain of longing, the book is mystical yet fiercely rationalist, ideological while coolly above politics ... brilliant, witty and complicated." Jay Parini wrote in The New York Times: "In this magnificent novel, Melville shows herself to be a discerning observer and a gifted satirist, the kind who takes no prisoners." In the Guyana Chronicle, Subraj Singh stated: "The book is one of my favourite pieces of literature from any Caribbean writer and it should be mandatory reading for anybody who claims to have an interest in the literature of Guyana."

=== The Migration of Ghosts (1998) ===
Her 1998 short-story collection, The Migration of Ghosts, is a book of complex layered tales of physical and emotional displacement. According to one reviewer: "A magnificent sense of pacing is the first of Melville's skills that impresses the reader of this mesmerizing collection. The second is her gift for voices ... she has an amazing range, from West Indians in London celebrating carnival, to the self-conscious, resentful Macusi Indian brought by her literal-minded British husband to a wedding in London, to the irritable Canadian wife whose husband has been sent to Guyana for two years to serve as unofficial liar for a mining corporation. Magic realism is the label most readers and critics will paste on Melville's work ... it is an appropriate but incomplete description. The dozen stories spill over with musical chaos and sly humor.... The magic in Melville's eccentric tales is neither good nor bad, white nor black, but the magic of the teeming pluralness and the many possibilities of life." Kirkus Reviews summed it up as: "An irresistible book and a fine introduction, for those who need one, to one of the best new writers on the international scene."

=== Eating Air (2009) ===
Melville's novel Eating Air, published in 2009, was called by The Independent "a virtuoso performance, playing with a gallimaufry of characters". In The Caribbean Review of Books, the novel was described by Vanessa Spence as "ambitious and sophisticated", while Lavinia Greenlaw wrote in the Financial Times: "The world of Pauline Melville’s fiction is one in which people slip in and out of place. It is full of shadows, transgressions and dark secrets. In her second novel, Eating Air, it is a remarkably wide world, flitting from south London to Italy, Brazil to Surinam, across the past 30 years. ... What makes this novel compelling is the way one person leads us to the next, and how we move out of the frame only to find ourselves back at the centre. ...Melville does not need to rely on rhetoric or charm. Her clean style and detached vision allow us to concentrate on what these people actually do as opposed to what they set out to do. This is a book about the difference between intention and action – and how we are acted upon far more than we know."

=== The Master of Chaos and Other Fables (2021) ===
Of her most recent book, The Master of Chaos and Other Fables (published in 2021 by Sandstone Press), Salman Rushdie was quoted as saying: "In this virtuoso performance, Pauline Melville shows us a world in upheaval, and reminds us that that's where we live." Benjamin Zephaniah writing in Vogue magazine praised the collection, saying: "There is love, politics, compassion, magic, and humour." Selecting "Anna Karenina and Madame Bovary Discuss Their Suicides" from the book as recommended reading, Brandon Taylor of Electric Lit stated: "How deftly Pauline Melville scummons these characters.... It's a marvel of a story about stories that asks probing questions about agency and narrative and what it means to take one's story back for oneself. All told with charm and warm intelligence."

=== Other literary activities and involvement ===
In 1992, her essay "Beyond the Pale" was included in the anthology Daughters of Africa, edited by Margaret Busby, as was the poem "Mixed", first published in David Dabydeen's 1998 Rented Rooms.

In November 2012, Melville delivered a lecture entitled "Guyanese Literature, Magic Realism and the South American Connection" in the Edgar Mittelholzer Memorial Lecture series at the Umana Yana in Georgetown.

Melville's work has also been broadcast on radio, including her story "Is This Platform Four Madam? Is it?", which was read by Deborah Findlay on BBC Radio 4 in 2019.

Melville was elected a Fellow of the Royal Society of Literature (RSL) in 2018.

== Awards and honours ==
- 1990: Commonwealth Writers' Prize (Regional and Overall Winner for Best First Book) for Shape-Shifter
- 1990: Guardian Fiction Prize for Shape-Shifter
- 1991: PEN/Macmillan Silver Pen Award for Shape-Shifter
- 1997: Whitbread First Novel Award for The Ventriloquist's Tale
- 1998: Orange Prize for Fiction (shortlist) for The Ventriloquist's Tale
- 1998: Guyana Prize for Literature for The Ventriloquist's Tale
- 2018: Elected a Fellow of the Royal Society of Literature

== Bibliography ==
=== Short-story collections ===
- Shape-Shifter, London: Women's Press, 1990, ISBN 978-0-7043-5051-9; Pantheon Books, 1991, ISBN 978-0-679-40438-5
- The Migration of Ghosts. London: Bloomsbury. 1998. ISBN 978-0-7475-3675-8.; Bloomsbury Publishing USA, 2000, ISBN 978-1-58234-074-6
- The Master of Chaos and Other Fables, Sandstone Press, 2021, ISBN 9781913207540

=== Novels ===
- The Ventriloquist's Tale, London: Bloomsbury Publishing, 1997, ISBN 978-0-7475-3150-0; Bloomsbury USA, 1999, ISBN 978-1-58234-026-5
- Eating Air (novel), London: Telegram, 2009, ISBN 978-1-84659-076-4

== Filmography ==
=== Films ===
- Ulysses (1967)
- Far from the Madding Crowd (1967), as Mrs. Tall
- The Long Good Friday (1980), as Dora
- Boom Boom, Out Go the Lights (1981), as Herself
- Britannia Hospital (1982), as Clarissa
- Scrubbers (1983), as Crow
- White City (1985), as Woman in dole office
- Mona Lisa (1986), as Dawn
- How to Get Ahead in Advertising (1989), as Mrs. Wailace
- The House of Bernarda Alba (1991)(TV), as Prudencia
- Utz (1992), as Curator
- Shadowlands (1993), as a Committee Chairwoman
- Home Away From Home (1994), as Neighbour
- Brighton Rock (2010), as Mother Superior

=== Television ===
- The Young Ones (1982/84, BBC Two), as Woman on Bus (in episode "Demolition") and Vyvyan's mum (in episodes "Boring" and "Sick"), plus witch (in “Sick”)
- Girls on Top (1985, ITV), playing Yvonne (three episodes)
- Happy Families (1985), playing a Warder
- Blackadder's Christmas Carol (1988), as Mrs. Scratchit
- The Comic Strip Presents (1988), as Pauline Sneak in episode "Didn't You Kill My Brother?", which she also co-wrote
- Alexei Sayle's Stuff (1988)
- Red Dwarf (1989), as Barmaid in "Backwards" (uncredited)
- Alas Smith and Jones (1990) (two episodes)
- 2 Point 4 Children (1992), playing Babs in episode "Hormones"
- The Young Indiana Jones Chronicles (1992), as Maisie Kemp in episode "London, May 1916"
- Desmond's (1992), as Mrs. Martin in episode "Too Red Eye"
- Spender (1993), as Judge in episode "The More Things Change"
- Ghostwriter (1994), as Wise Rita (one episode)
- The Bill (1997), as Mrs Austin in "No Trace", Season 13, Episode 136
