= Tony Allen (comedian) =

English comedian and writer (1945–2023)

- Allen in 1983
- Birth name: Anthony Lawrence Allen
- Born: 4 March 1945; Hayes, Middlesex, England
- Died: 1 December 2023 (aged 78)
- Website: "New Agenda Arts Trust"

Anthony Lawrence Allen (4 March 1945 – 1 December 2023) was an English comedian and writer. Known as the "godfather of alternative comedy", Allen was one of the original alternative comedians. In May 1979, following notoriety at Speakers' Corner with his "Full-Frontal Anarchy Platform", he began to perform at The Comedy Store. Two months later he founded Alternative Cabaret with Alexei Sayle and ran a regular "Alt Cab" Club night in the back bar of the Elgin pub on Ladbroke Grove in London.

== Stand-up comedy ==
Allen was resident comedian in the early days of The Comedy Store, London (1979–1980) and took over from Alexei Sayle as resident MC early in 1981, where he was described as, "A tall, willowy figure who has the air of a Lenny Bruce mixed with the vulnerability of Tommy Cooper". According to an early article about him, Allen's style of stand-up "is not so much jokes and gags, as having a slant on a view of the world. Sex life, relationships, the contradictions between the theory and practice of an anarchist/lefty." His desire to challenge audiences could lead to varying results, as noted in a 1986 fanzine: "I've seen Tony Allen do minutes of cursing, swearing, abusing of heckler and audience alike (Comedy Store, Autumn '85) and equally I've seen him do sets of such comic brilliance as to take your breath away and send you home to your bed-sit on wings! The last time I saw him was at The Pied Bull, and his set was a mixture of both. Except, tell me of another comedian who could order an audience of cabaret lovers not to applaud him when he left the stage because he wasn't happy with his set, and have that same audience remaining mutely passive in an alt cab equivalent of one minutes silence."

In 1980, Tony Allen and Alexei Sayle took their solo stand-up acts to the Edinburgh Festival Fringe under the title "Late Night Alternative". Allen continued to appear on the Edinburgh Fringe for the next twelve years. Most successful was his "1984 Meaning of Life Crusade", with Sharon Landau and Roy Hutchins.

In the early 1980s, Allen supported rock bands, including Killing Joke at the Lyceum (26 July 1981) and The Clash at Portsmouth Guildhall (28 July 1982). He also supported anarcho-punk band Poison Girls on two national "No Nukes Music" tours.

In the late 1980s, he was a founder member of Green Wedge, and performed in a series of one-off benefit gigs as MC/support to, among others, John Martyn, Osibisa and Joe Strummer's Latino Rockabilly War.

In 1989, Allen acted the role of Clopin, King of the Thieves in Max Handley's stage musical Quasimodo.

In 1990, Allen toured extensively with his solo show "Sold Out", about an Amazonian tribal shaman who understands both the workings of the futures exchange and the logic of Heisenberg's Uncertainty Principle. A truncated version of the Heisenberg piece was also featured on Granada TV's Fourth Dimension.

Economics, viewed as a bogus science for scam artists causing both personal and planetary debt, was one of the subjects tackled in his full-length stand-up Edinburgh show "Final Demand – The Grim Repo Man is at the Door" in 1993.

In 1994, Allen teamed up again with Sharon Landau and Roy Hutchins for a season of live cabaret gigs, "Ain't Necessarily Solo".

His last solo show before semi-retirement was "The End is Nigh", a mischievous piece of panic-mongering about the Y2K bug which took the form of a public meeting, and had its final performance, pertinently, at Speakers' Corner in October 1999, before he went to live in the hills of Cumbria for a year.

In July 2023, a tribute gig in Ladbroke Grove was organised for Allen called "This Was Your Life".

== Plays ==
Allen's theatrical career began in the early 1970s with theatre groups such as West London Theatre Workshop and Pirate Jenny. In 1973, Allen was co-founder with John Miles of Rough Theatre, described by Heathcote Williams as "a street theatre group from the Ladbroke Archipelago which specializes in low comedy, political satire, ham oratory, and spontaneous busking…and they perform in the pubs, streets, gutters, and community centres of the Corrugated Iron Belt." Rough Theatre sometimes performed at a squatting venue called the Charlie Pig Dog Club, occasionally sharing the bill there with Joe Strummer's pub pock band, the 101ers. Allen co-wrote and performed in all five of its productions. The most memorable was Dwelling Unit Sweet Dwelling Unit (1973)—which he later adapted for BBC Radio 4's Thirty-Minute Theatre (1977)—and Free Milk and Orange Juice (1976), which had a short run at the ICA.

During the 1970s, Allen wrote three more radio plays including an Afternoon Theatre play, Two Fingers Finnegan Comes Again, co-written with Vernon Magee and bespoke for the actor Wilfrid Brambell. He went on to devise and write over twenty plays for fringe and community theatre, most memorably, Metropolitan with Ken Robinson, for the Young People's Theatre Scheme at The Royal Court Theatre; and various productions at The Theatre Royal, Stratford East, including their Christmas panto Robin Hood (1975), which he co-wrote with Heathcote Williams. Allen later co-wrote a television play with Ken Robinson—Que Sera for TVS's Dramarama.

== Journalism ==
Allen's obsession with small press journalism led him into countless publishing ventures, most notoriously the vacant property bulletins of the "Ruff Tuff Creem Puff Estate Agency for Squatters", again with Heathcote Williams (1975–76); the Ladbroke Grove monthly Corrugated Times (1976); "The New Instant" with Chris Saunders (1985), and the eighth re-launch of International Times (1986). Allen continued writing columns for radical journals, the most recent being "Lofty Tone" in the late 1990s DIY activist rag, Squall.

== Scripts ==
With his writing partner Max Handley (1945–1990) Allen was occasional script-writer for many TV and radio shows such as Spitting Image, Naked Video, Week Ending and Alas Smith and Jones. Allen and Handley were also responsible for the words to the daily three-frame comic strip "Soho Square" in the short-lived London Daily News; Pete Rigg was the cartoonist.

In the late 1980s, he contributed regular scripts and prose to the youth comic magazines Crisis, Revolver and Judge Dredd – The Megazine. Of particular interest were a 24-page graphic documentary with artist Dave Hine about events leading to the Tiananmen Square massacre, and an 11-page strip called "Didn't You Love My Brother" that fictionalised an encounter with a heckler that Allen experienced whilst on tour with the anarchist punk band Poison Girls.

== Television ==
Allen played an anarchist named Fisher in the first-series episode of The Young Ones, entitled "Interesting" (1982).

In 1989 and 1990, Allen and Caron Keating co-presented the Granada TV/Channel 4 science-based programme Fourth Dimension, which included performing (and co-writing with Handley) a weekly five-minute piece to camera, plus other filmed journalism.

In The Heckler, Allen was seen in a mentoring role to a couple of trainee hecklers, as the central theme for BBC3 TV's documentary about the history of political heckling at the hustings, coinciding with the 2005 General Election.

== Workshops ==
Tony Allen started teaching stand-up comedy in 1982. From the late 1980s to the mid-1990s, he was a regular workshop tutor with the drama department of Middlesex University. From 2003 onwards, he had a similar relationship with the drama department at the University of Kent, working with former comic Dr. Oliver Double. Allen was the artistic director of New Agenda Arts Trust beginning in June 1995. Late in 1995, New Agenda launched the "Performance Club" to promote innovative performers and to showcase emerging workshop talent. In 2005, The Performance Club took up a two-year residency at the Inn on the Green, London W11. Most notable among the regular performers was Ken Campbell.

== Dismaland ==
In a tribute written after Allen's death, graffiti artist Banksy revealed to the BBC that it was "troublemaker" Allen who had trained stewards at Banksy's dystopian art project Dismaland: "Tony delivered the most surly and incompetent employees in the history of hospitality. They were incapable or unwilling to even point out the fire exits... they popped the balloons they were meant to be selling, they threw people's change on the floor, they even went up to random members of the public and licked their ice creams... They became by far the most talked about part of the show, overshadowing six months of my hard work and the efforts of 50 invited international artists."

== Death ==
Allen died on 1 December 2023, at the age of 78. He was remembered on BBC Radio 4's obituary programme Last Word.

== Publications ==
Attitude! Wanna Make Something of it? The Secret of Stand-up Comedy – published by Gothic Image (2002).

A Summer in the Park. A Journal of Speakers' Corner – published by Freedom Press (2004)

== Collections ==
In 2014 Allen deposited some of his archive material with the British Stand-Up Comedy Archive at the University of Kent. The collection of audiovisual material includes audio cassettes and sound tape reels which document his career.

== Sound recordings ==
- One of Our Safety Valves is Missing – a 45-minute recorded live stage act produced by John Williams for Red Tapes (1980).
- Alternative Cabaret – an album showcasing four alternative comedians: Tony Allen, Jim Barclay, Pauline Melville and Andy de la Tour (1981).
