= Quo Vadis (restaurant) =

Restaurant in Dean Street, Soho, London

Coordinates: 51.51401°N 0.13264°W

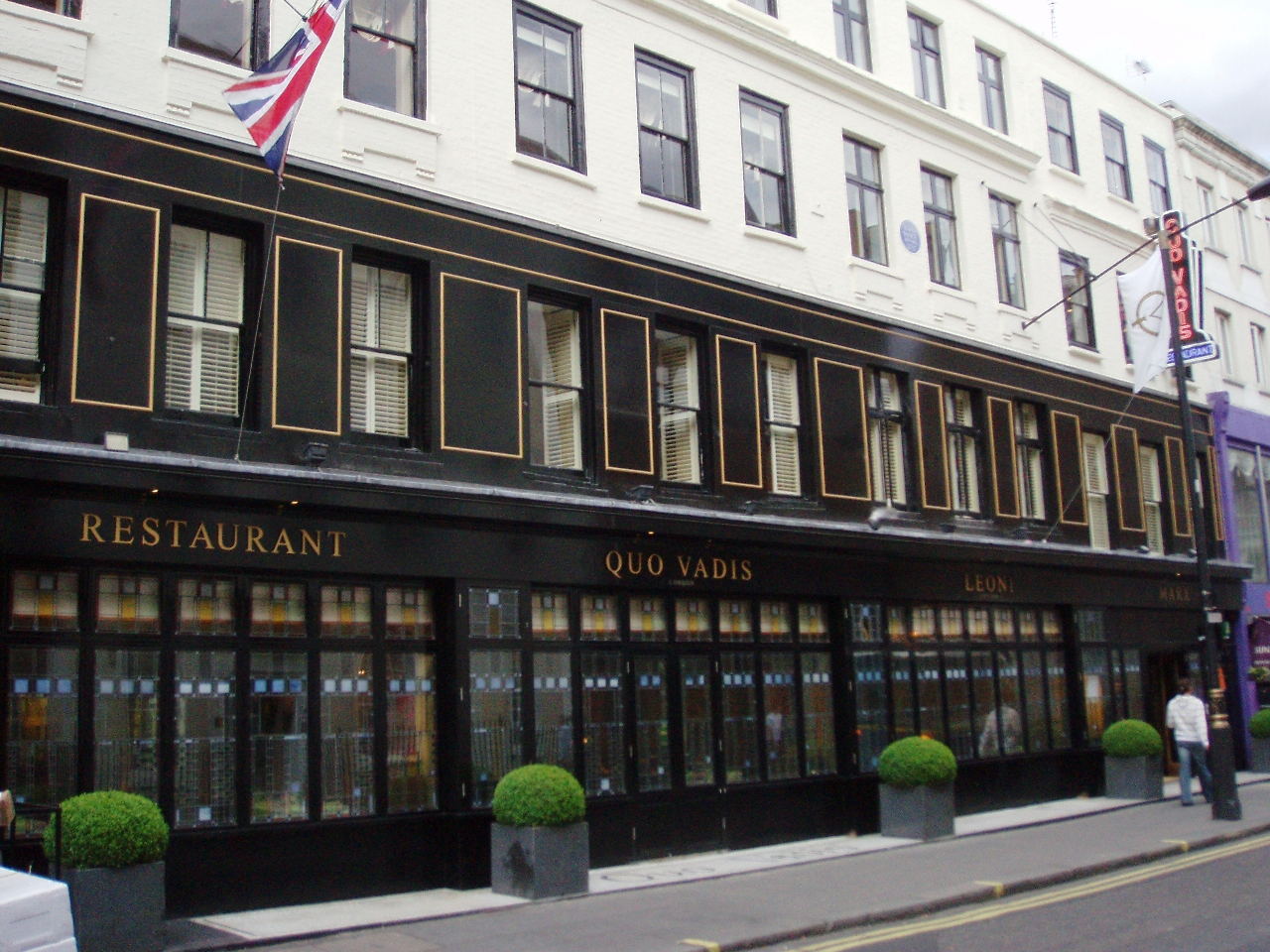
- Interactive map of Quo Vadis

Restaurant information
- Established: 1926; 100 years ago
- Owners: Sam and Eddie Hart
- Food type: Modern British
- Dress code: None
- Location: Dean Street, Soho, London, W1, United Kingdom
- Other information: Nearest station: Tottenham Court Road
- Website: quovadissoho.co.uk

Quo Vadis is a restaurant and private club in Soho, London. It primarily serves modern British food. It was founded in 1926 by Peppino Leoni, an Italian, and has passed through numerous owners since then, including the chef Marco Pierre White, and is currently owned by Sam and Eddie Hart, also the owners of Barrafina. The restaurant is named after the Latin phrase Quo vadis?, meaning "Where are you going?"

== History ==
=== Building ===
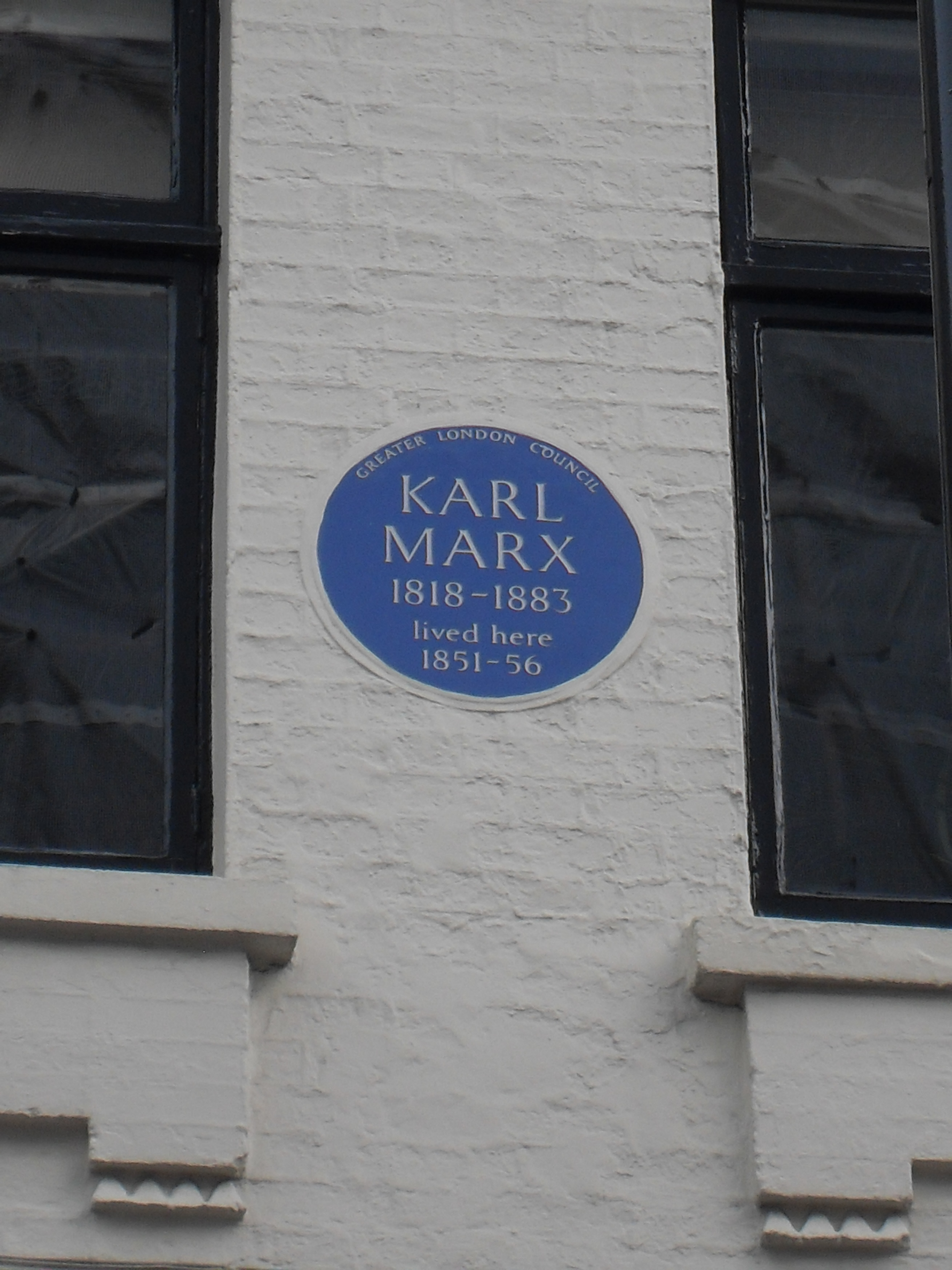
Blue plaque commemorating Karl Marx's residency at 28 Dean Street

The restaurant occupies numbers 26–29 Dean Street. Nos. 26–28 form a uniform group built in c. 1734 by the carpenter John Nolloth, of St James's, and No. 29 was built in c. 1692. The sculptor Joseph Nollekens was born in the latter house in 1737; a later resident was the composer François-Hippolyte Barthélémon. Karl Marx and his family lived in two small rooms at No. 28, described as an "old hovel", between 1851 and 1856; his residency is commemorated by a London County Council blue plaque. It was due to the association with Marx that numbers 26–28 were made a Grade I listed building on 14 January 1970.

=== Restaurant ===
The restaurant was founded in 1926 by Peppino Leoni. When Leoni originally opened Quo Vadis in 1926, it only occupied No. 27. He purchased the property, with the aid of a bank loan for £800. Its name was chosen after Leoni saw a billboard in Leicester Square advertising a film of the same name. Quo Vadis is Latin for "Where are you going?". The cinematic epic, adapted from Henryk Sienkiewicz's 1896 novel Quo Vadis, was the highest-grossing film in 1951.

In 1996, the restaurant was bought by Marco Pierre White and Damien Hirst, and featured paintings by the artist as well as a bar designed by him. The pair later parted company after a public falling out, following which White replaced Hirst's paintings with some of his own.

In November 2007, head chef and owner Marco Pierre White sold the restaurant, along with two others, to restaurant group Conduit Street. Quo Vadis was then sold on again to Sam and Eddie Hart, who immediately closed it down. Both White and the Hart brothers endured criticism as Christmas bookings were cancelled. The Hart brothers re-opened the restaurant in 2008 with head Chef Jean Philippe Patruno (previously at Fino) following extensive restoration work and, in 2009, it won Tatler magazine's Restaurant of the Year award.

In July 2008, celebrity chef Gordon Ramsay named Quo Vadis as his favourite restaurant, describing the Hart brothers as "restaurateurs in the fullest sense of the word". The Evening Standard characterised this praise as a "thinly veiled attack" on Marco Pierre White, with whom Ramsay has an antipathetic relationship.

On the front-right of the restaurant is the curious sight of a human nose. While rumours of connections to ancient Roman legends of traitors having their noses cut off and fed to animals have sprung up, it is one of several London Noses.

In January 2012 Jeremy Lee, formerly of London's Blueprint Café, joined Sam and Eddie Hart as chef and partner at Quo Vadis. Upon Lee's arrival the restaurant underwent some cosmetic changes and began a collaboration with artist John Broadley, starting with the distinctive illustrated menus.

In September 2012 the QV Bakery was launched and a month later, in October 2012, Quo Vadis began offering breakfast.

== Critical reception ==
Quo Vadis under its current ownership has received generally positive reviews. Tatler has listed it as one of its top 20 restaurants, in July 2008 The Times reviewer Giles Coren gave the restaurant a score of 9 out of 10, describing the food as "all done beautifully" and in June 2008 The Telegraph's reviewer, Jasper Gerard, gave it 8 out of 10 and said that visitors would "adore the cooking".

Tracey MacLeod of The Independent was less positive, giving the restaurant 2 out of 5 for ambience and service, although 4 out of 5 for food. She described the waiters as "skittish" and said that the Hart brothers were "not natural hosts".

In January 2012 Fay Maschler of the Evening Standard gave Quo Vadis four out of five stars, stating "The combination of lovely Jeremy Lee, the hard-working Hart brothers and "Spitz" is the dream team of which my nights are made." In February 2013 Giles Coren reviewed Quo Vadis in The Times Magazine, describing the menu as 'simple, perfect', the smoked eel and horseradish sandwich as a 'must-have' and the squid and fennel salad 'clean and dainty'. Also in February 2012 Nick Lander wrote a review of Quo Vadis in the Financial Times, calling the cooking "exciting, vibrant and fresh."

== See also ==
- List of British restaurants
