= The Greatest Show on Legs =

Surreal comedy group

The Greatest Show On Legs

Comedy career
- Years active: 1978–present
- Medium: Comedy, television, theatre
- Genres: Sketch comedy, surreal humour, physical comedy
- Members: Martin Soan; Adam Taffler; Matt Roper
- Former members: Malcolm Hardee; Terry Alderton; Adam Bloom; Steve Bowditch; Dr. Brown; Keith Chegwin; Chris Lynam; Simon Munnery; Dickie Richards; Bob Slayer; Arthur Smith; Holly Burn; Chris Lynam
- Website: martinsoan.co.uk/gsol

The Greatest Show On Legs (also known as The Legs) is a surreal comedy group, founded in the United Kingdom by comedian Martin Soan, and joined after by the late Malcolm Hardee. The group, continually performing with a changing line-up with Soan at the helm, played an important role in the development of alternative comedy at the end of the 1970s and into the 1980s.

== Creation ==
The Greatest Show on Legs was founded as a one-man adult Punch and Judy act by Martin Soan as a teenager. He discovered that if he wore the puppet booth over his shoulders, revealing only his legs, he could easily carry the show from pub to pub. Malcolm Hardee, recently released from prison, became Martin's driver and The Legs soon evolved into a surreal sketch group. The Greatest Show on Legs became a regular at the Tramshed venue in Woolwich, alongside the likes of Rik Mayall and Ade Edmondson. Soon afterwards, in 1979, The Comedy Store opened in Soho and The Greatest Show on Legs became regulars there.

== Naked Balloon Dance ==
Their breakthrough came in 1982, when they performed the Naked Balloon Dance, their signature sketch, on Chris Tarrant's anarchic late-night television show O.T.T., earning huge applause from the studio audience but drawing complaints from Mary Whitehouse, the founder of the National Viewers and Listeners Association. The backing tune used was Joe Loss' 1961 recording of "Wheels."

The Legs also performed the dance at a Trades Union Congress conference in Blackpool during the years of Margaret Thatcher's Conservative government, substituting large cut-outs of the Prime Minister's face in place of the balloons.

According to Soan, the sketch was first performed in Totnes, Devon: "The Greatest Show on Legs reacted to the local extreme, over-the-top feminists who were living in this land of privilege and having weekly meetings about how they could wipe out Chinese foot-binding. Shit. They were all living in a bubble, really. It was our reaction to that. We thought up the balloon dance in the kitchen and we went to the Dartmouth Inn that night and premiered it”, adding "The Greatest Show on Legs were feminists, but they were feminists who weren’t really thinking. In actual fact, we were rather gallant as a group of performers."

== Present day ==
The Legs continue to be presented internationally with an ever changing line-up, under the direction of founder member Martin Soan. They have performed at Montreal's Just For Laughs festival and several times at the Edinburgh Festival Fringe. In 2011, The Greatest Show On Legs appeared in Stewart Lee's At Last! The 1981 Show at the Royal Festival Hall.
