= Manchester Comedy Festival =

The Manchester Comedy Festival was founded by comedian Don Ward and held every October from 2001 to 2011. It began after members of Manchester City Council decided, given the size of the city, it should have a standalone comedy festival. At its peak, it drew thousands to 30 venues for about 200 performances. However, suffering from diminishing council funding, comedians were forced to run their own fundraisers to ensure the 2011 festival could go ahead. This proved unsustainable and the festival was scrapped in August 2012, to comedians' disappointment.
