= Jossy's Giants =

- Genre: Comedy
- Written by: Sid Waddell
- Directed by: Edward Pugh
- Starring: Jim Barclay
- Country of origin: United Kingdom
- Original language: English
- No. of series: 2
- No. of episodes: 10

Production
- Running time: 25 minutes

Original release
- Network: BBC 1
- Release: 23 April 1986 – 8 April 1987

Jossy's Giants is a children's footballing comedy drama that ran on BBC1 between 23 April 1986 and 8 April 1987. The show's plot centred on a boys' football team, the Glipton Grasshoppers, and their enthusiastic Geordie manager Joswell 'Jossy' Blair. The show was written by darts commentator and television personality Sid Waddell, himself a native of Newcastle upon Tyne. Ten episodes were made. The producer and director Edward Pugh later became an executive producer and ran the Children's Programmes Department at BBC Manchester. The theme music was written by Mike Amatt. Football scenes were shot at a since demolished Oldham Town FC site off Middleton Road, Chadderton, exterior scenes were shot in and around Stalybridge, and the studio material was shot at BBC Oxford Road.

== Cast ==
Many of the child actors from the series have since left acting, although Jim Barclay, who played Jossy Blair, has appeared on My Family and Blessed. Julian Walsh, who played Harvey, has appeared in Sorted and The Street. Walsh was also the face of the Warburton's Bread TV advertising campaign in 2007.

External videos
- Jossys Giants visit St James' Park

Julie Foy, who played Tracey Gaunt, went on to appear in Press Gang and Coronation Street and acted on stage and in film. In 2017 Julie was Assistant Producer on the short film The Silent Child which won Best Live Action Short Film at the Academy Awards. Suzanne Hall, who appeared in four episodes as Harvey's girlfriend Opal, went on to appear in Hollyoaks.

=== Cast ===
Character	Played by	Notes
Jossy Blair	Jim Barclay	Profligate manager of the Glipton Grasshoppers and fiancé to Glenda Fletcher
Albert Hanson	Christopher Burgess	Blair's assistant manager and business partner
Tracey Gaunt	Julie Foy	The Giants' number one fan
Bob Nelson	John Judd	Jack of all trades and father to Ross
Ross Nelson	Mark Gillard	Glipton's star turn
Ricky Sweet	Paul Kirkbright	Captain of the team
Harvey McGuinn	Julian Walsh	Goalkeeper
Glenn Rix	Stuart McGuinness	One of two outlandishly coiffured strikers
Ian 'Selly' Sellick	Ian Sheppard	As above
Wayne Chapman	Oliver Orr	Club stalwart
Daz	Lee Quarmby	Bright young thing
Cllr Glenda Fletcher	Jenny McCracken	Jossy Blair's fiancée

== Releases ==
Jossy's Giants was released on DVD in 2018 by Simply Media.
