= Scummy Mummies =

Scummy Mummies are a British-Australian comedy double act composed of Ellie Gibson and Helen Thorn. The pair host a parenting podcast and live comedy show.

== Formation ==
Ellie Gibson, who is the daughter of Jim Barclay, was a video games journalist before starting to perform stand-up comedy in 2013. Around this time, Helen Thorn, an Australian, returned to stand-up after a break of several years.

They hosted a podcast, and did stand-up comedy.
