= The Ventriloquist's Tale =

1997 novel by Pauline Melville

- Author: Pauline Melville
- Language: English
- Publisher: Bloomsbury Publishing
- Publication date: 1997
- Publication place: Guayana
- Pages: 368
- ISBN: 1-58234-009-9

The Ventriloquist's Tale is a novel by British Guayanese author Pauline Melville, published in 1997 by Bloomsbury Publishing. The book follows an indigenous Guyanese family across several generations. The novel attracted generally positive reviews. It won the Whitbread First Novel Award and was shortlisted for the Women's Prize for Fiction.

== Background ==
Melville was partly inspired to write the novel after reading Evelyn Waugh's novel A Handful of Dust.

== Summary ==
The novel's plot focuses on a Wapishana family over the course of a century. A framing device is used, in which a present-day subsistence farmer named Chofy McKinnon moves from the bush to Guyana's capital city, Georgetown. The narrative explores McKinnon's ancestry. The ventriloquist, a being that is part bird, part spirit, provides commentary.

== Reception ==
Critics gave The Ventriloquist's Tale mostly positive reviews. The New York Times said the novel was "sumptuously written" and compared Melville's writing to the work of Evelyn Waugh. The Guyana Chronicle claimed the book "should be mandatory reading for anybody who claims to have an interest in the literature of Guyana."

== Awards ==
The Ventriloquist's Tale won the 1998 edition of the Whitbread First Novel Award. It was also shortlisted for the Women's Prize for Fiction in the same year. The award's website described the book as "large in scope but intimate as a whisper."
