= Bateman Street =

Street in London's Soho district

Coordinates: 51.5141°N 0.1314°W

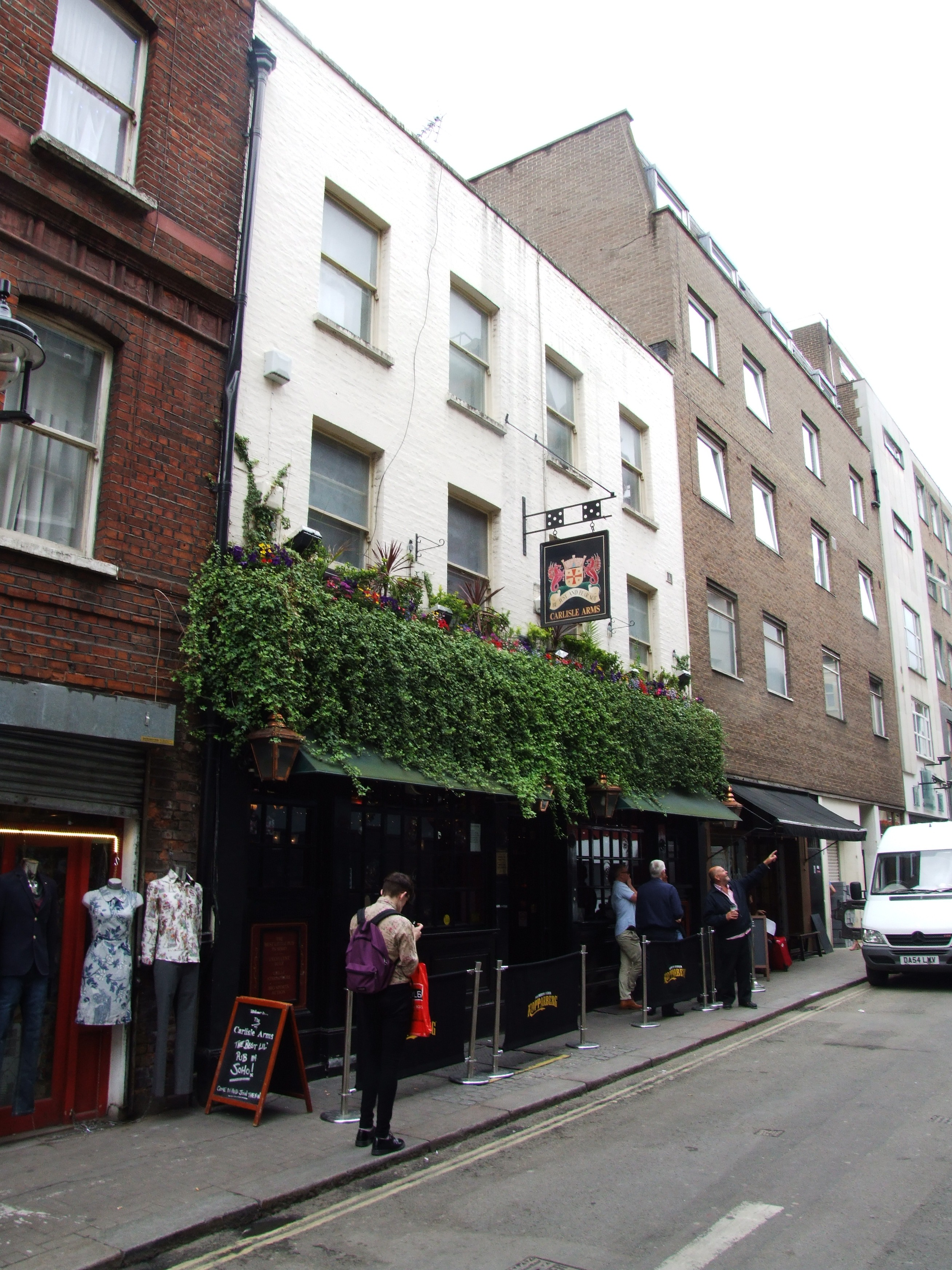
The former Carlisle Arms in Bateman Street, now the site of Simmons Soho

Bateman Street is a street in London's Soho district linking Greek Street to Dean Street, and crossing Frith Street between them. It is named after Bateman's Buildings, built on the site of the former Monmouth House. It was formerly called Queen Street.

William Le Queux described it in 1895 in The Temptress as being grimy and squalid, home to "spirited juveniles of the unwashed class".

It is said to be the location of one of the Seven Noses of Soho.
