= Chris Lynam =

British alternative comedian and clown

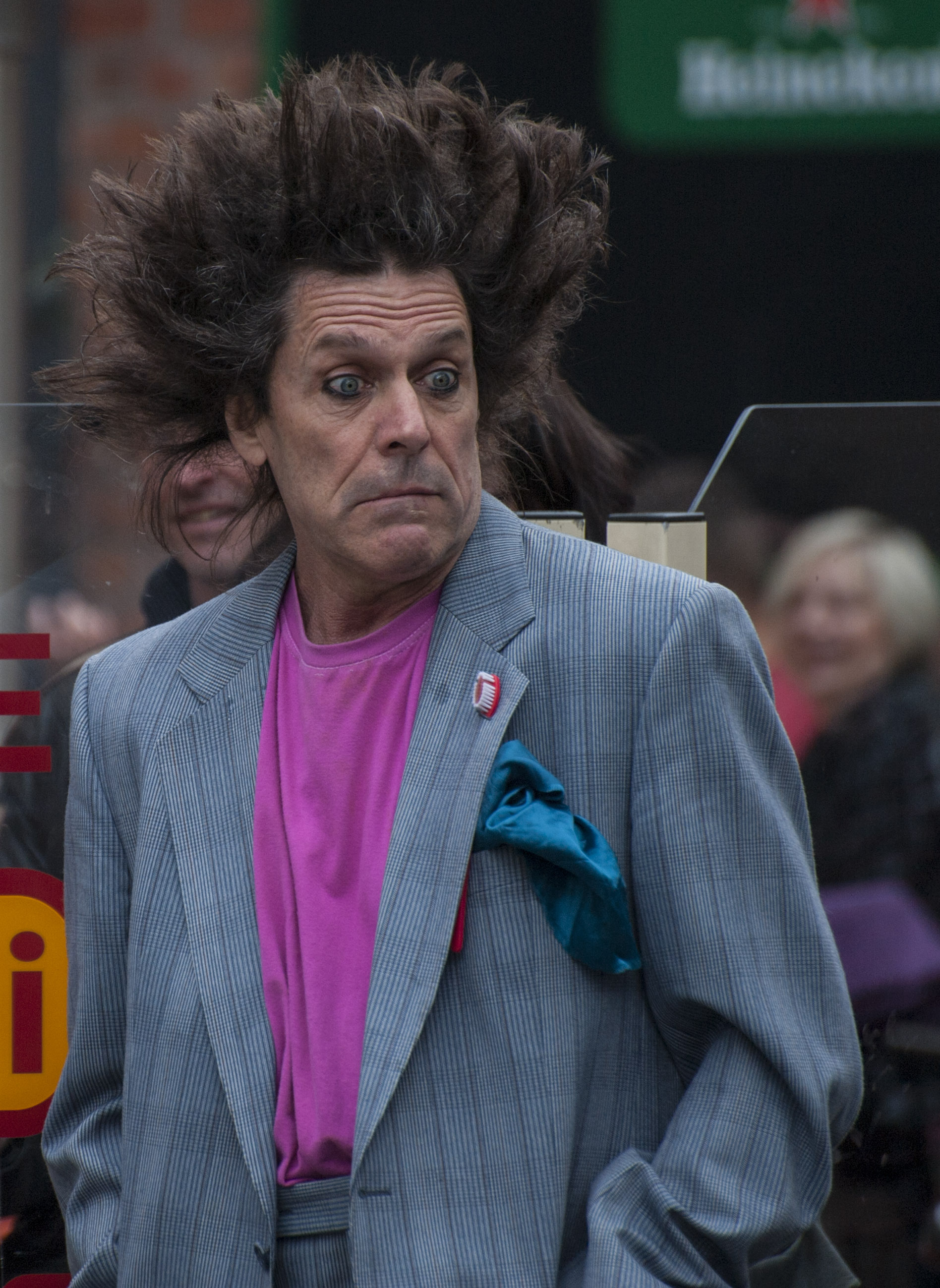
- Lynam at the Festival of Fools in 2013
- Born: 1953 (age 72–73); Zimbabwe

Comedy career
- Medium: comedy, television
- Genres: Alternative comedy, clown

Chris Lynam, born in 1953 in Zimbabwe, is a British alternative comedian and clown. He has been described by Total Theatre magazine as "a stalwart of street performance, cabaret, festival and stage for over 30 years."

He has appeared on television and radio series such as TV Burp, Loose Ends and La France a un incroyable talent.

Lynam was a performer in the British comedy troupe The Greatest Show on Legs.

A former business partner of Lynam's was fellow Greatest Show on Legs performer, comedian and club owner Malcolm Hardee, who died in 2005.

One of Lyman's long time signature comedic routines is to place a firework inside his buttocks and ignite it.

In 2015 he performed in the stage play EricTheFred, developed in collaboration with John Wright and Thomas Kubinek, with music by Kevin Sargent.

== Media ==
Manchester Evening News, "For every clued up crowd Lynam plays there's an unsuspecting, comedy-virgin audience to shock even more."

British Comedy Guide, "In the very early days of circuit, many alternative comedians truly lived up to their title. Take Chris Lynam, an anarchic clown whose act finished quite literally with a bang – he would place a firework up his backside and light the fuse."

The New York Times, "A brilliantly bizarre antidote to today's truculent society."
