= Alternative Cabaret =

English comedy collective of politically motivated performers and musicians

Alternative Cabaret was a group of politically motivated performers, jokingly described by one of its founder members, Tony Allen, as 'a sort of collective of comedians, musicians – dope smokers, dole scroungers, tax evaders, sexual deviants, political extremists'. It was set up by Allen and Alexei Sayle in the summer of 1979 shortly after they had met at the newly opened London Comedy Store. They quickly recruited comedians Jim Barclay, Andy de la Tour and Pauline Melville; plus folk duos Chisholm and Stevens and Gasmask and Hopkins a.k.a. Alexander Arundel and Stuart Turner. Plus jazz salsa band Combo Passe. Alternative Cabaret performed their first show at the Pindar of Wakefield pub (now the Water Rats) on Grays Inn Road on 15 August 1979.

Sayle would record a single as a double A side recorded live at The Comedy Store along with Alexander Arundel, whose band Flak released the song When The Gold Runs Dry with Alexei on 4 Play Records.

Echoing what was already happening in a few fringe theatres, most notably the Albany Deptford and the Half Moon Mile End, members were encouraged to open regular club nights under the name Alternative Cabaret in pub function rooms, student union bars and community venues around London. The flagship Alt Cab night was run by Allen and Sayle in the back bar of the Elgin in Ladbroke Grove, between 16 August 1979 and 22 May 1980. While always an adamant non-member Keith Allen was a regular guest at many Alt Cab club nights. Among other regular guests were Maggie Steed and Arnold Brown.

The non-racist, non-sexist, and often radical slant to the material of Alternative Cabaret’s comedians soon became the main attraction and the focus of press interest; as a consequence the phrase Alternative Comedy became parlance and was employed to describe an emerging approach to comedy entertainment across the London fringe including The Comedy Store where audiences and performers were still often being polarised into opposing Alternative and Traditional camps.

Shortly before he parted company with Alternative Cabaret, Alexei Sayle joined Tony Allen to play the Edinburgh festival in Aug 1980 with Late Night Alternative at the Heriot-Watt Theatre. From October 1980 he fronted the first season of alternative cabaret titled The Comic Strip at the Boulevard Theatre within the Raymond Revuebar, bringing in selected stand-up acts from the Comedy Store, a lineup who were soon to become television stars with The Comic Strip Presents.

Meanwhile in 1981 Allen returned to the Edinburgh festival with a show simply titled Alternative Cabaret alongside Andy De La Tour, Jim Barclay, Pauline Melville, and a musician called Phil Nichol. A reviewer wrote, 'All of them are riotous...you could laugh at Alternative Cabaret when alone, without any goading from the audience.' This was followed by an album entitled Alternative Cabaret on Original Records later that year. This featured recordings of Pauline Melville (performing both as her character Edie and as herself), recorded at the Greyhound Fulham and the University of London Students Union; and recordings of Tony Allen, Jim Barclay and Andy de la Tour performing at the ADC Theatre, Cambridge on 29 May 1981. Unedited recordings of the performances by Allen, Barclay and de la Tour are held in the British Stand-Up Comedy Archive at the University of Kent.

Having served its purpose, Alternative Cabaret then quietly disbanded and merged into what was becoming the thriving London Alternative Comedy circuit.

== See also ==
- The Comic Strip
- Saturday Live (UK TV series)
- The Comedy Store (London)
- Batcave (club)
- Gargoyle Club
