= Jenny McCracken =

British actress

- Born: Jennifer Anne Morris
- Occupations: Actress, acting coach
- Years active: 1964–present
- Spouse: Jeremy McCracken (m. 1966)

Jenny McCracken is a British actress. Her memorable roles are as Jenny in series 1 of sitcom The Mistress, Glenda Jackson in children's football series Jossy's Giants, Clara Peggotty in the 1986 adaptation of David Copperfield and Linda Kelsey in series 5 of Peak Practice.

== Early life ==
As a young girl, McCracken wanted to become an actress when playing dress-up. In 1964, she appeared in an episode of Crossroads before attending Rose Bruford College. It was here that she met Jeremy McCracken from the Class of 1966. On 29 October that year, they were married in Bexhill-on-Sea before she graduated the following year. Looking for stage work in London, the couple ended up working as cleaners, as well as babysitting dogs. Eventually, he became a film editor for Thames Television, producer and freelance director.

== Career ==
In 1970, McCracken along with Cheryl Hall, was on the final shortlist of six actresses for the role of companion Jo Grant in science fiction series Doctor Who. Ultimately, Katy Manning won the part but as a direct consequence of their auditions, producer Barry Letts promised the two candidates he'd use them in the future. True to his word, he cast them in guest roles when directing Carnival of Monsters two years later.

McCracken's other television work includes Z-Cars, The First Lady, Counterstrike, Detective, ITV Sunday Night Theatre, Ace of Wands, Special Branch, Dawson's Weekly, The Dick Emery Show, Only When I Laugh, The Fourth Arm, Dombey and Son, Dramarama, Casualty, The Bill, Jackanory, The Worst Witch, Holby City, Heartbeat, Doctors and Judge John Deed.

She also featured in many commercials, providing voicework in different accents, aided by her ability to speak French, German and Spanish fluently.

== Later life ==
In addition to acting, McCracken has worked as an acting coach at the Actors Centre in London, training people hoping to enter the acting profession. Among those she has trained include actor Luke Goss, as well as coaching on the film The Fifth Element.
