= Max Handley =

British comedy writer

Max Handley (1945–1990) was a British comedy writer. He was born in Blackpool, Lancashire on 23 December 1945 and educated at Arnold School and the University of Sussex. He worked on Radio Four's Week Ending and other programmes often with Tony Allen. In 1988 he wrote the script for the comedy musical Quasimodo, with music by Richard Rowland. Between 1971 and 1974 he recorded songs at Richard Branson's Manor Studio and these were issued in 1974 on an LP titled Max, on Virgin's budget Caroline label imprint. A single, "Stephanie" (B-side "All I Know"), was taken from the LP and released on the Virgin label proper (as was normal for those Caroline artists that got to release singles). The album and single were credited to "Max", with the surname dropped. The Virgin label connection came about because Handley had been on the production team for Richard Branson's Student magazine.

Handley's first novel Oliver Poges Lives was published by Arlington Books Ltd in 1970 and takes the form of a series of letters detailing increasingly bizarre suicide attempts by the protagonist. This was followed by Sheep in 1971, also published by Arlington Books Ltd.

His 1977 Science Fiction novel Meanwhile is set on an unnamed island and combines a wide range of individual narratives and themes.

"Handley develops a society where men and women have been segregated in separate communities (the former survive by cloning, the latter by parthenogenisis) and even these have further fragmented into closed groups, filled with comical misconceptions of each other. A series of crises eventually fling a few survivors of these scattered bands together to begin a new era." (Ray Thompson in Science Fiction and Fantasy book review, 2009)

All three of Handley's novels are currently out of print.

Max Handley was killed in a paragliding accident.
