= Don Ward (comedian) =

British comedy entrepreneur

Don Ward is a British comedy entrepreneur, producer and CEO of The Comedy Store which he co-founded in 1979 in London's Soho. In 2003, he was listed in The Observer as one of the 50 funniest acts in British comedy, and although he performed as a variety performer in the 1970s, he is not actually known as a comedian.

Owner of the London and Manchester Comedy Stores, he opened a branch in Leeds in 2002, but closed it after just eight months. The company now has clubs in Manchester and Mumbai. In 2001 he founded the Manchester Comedy Festival.

Ward started out as a stand-up himself, hosting rock and roll road shows with the stars of the day including Cliff Richard, Marty Wilde, and Billy Fury. He is also co-executive producer of The Comedy Store series for Comedy Central.
