= The Comedy Store (London) =

Comedy club in Soho, London

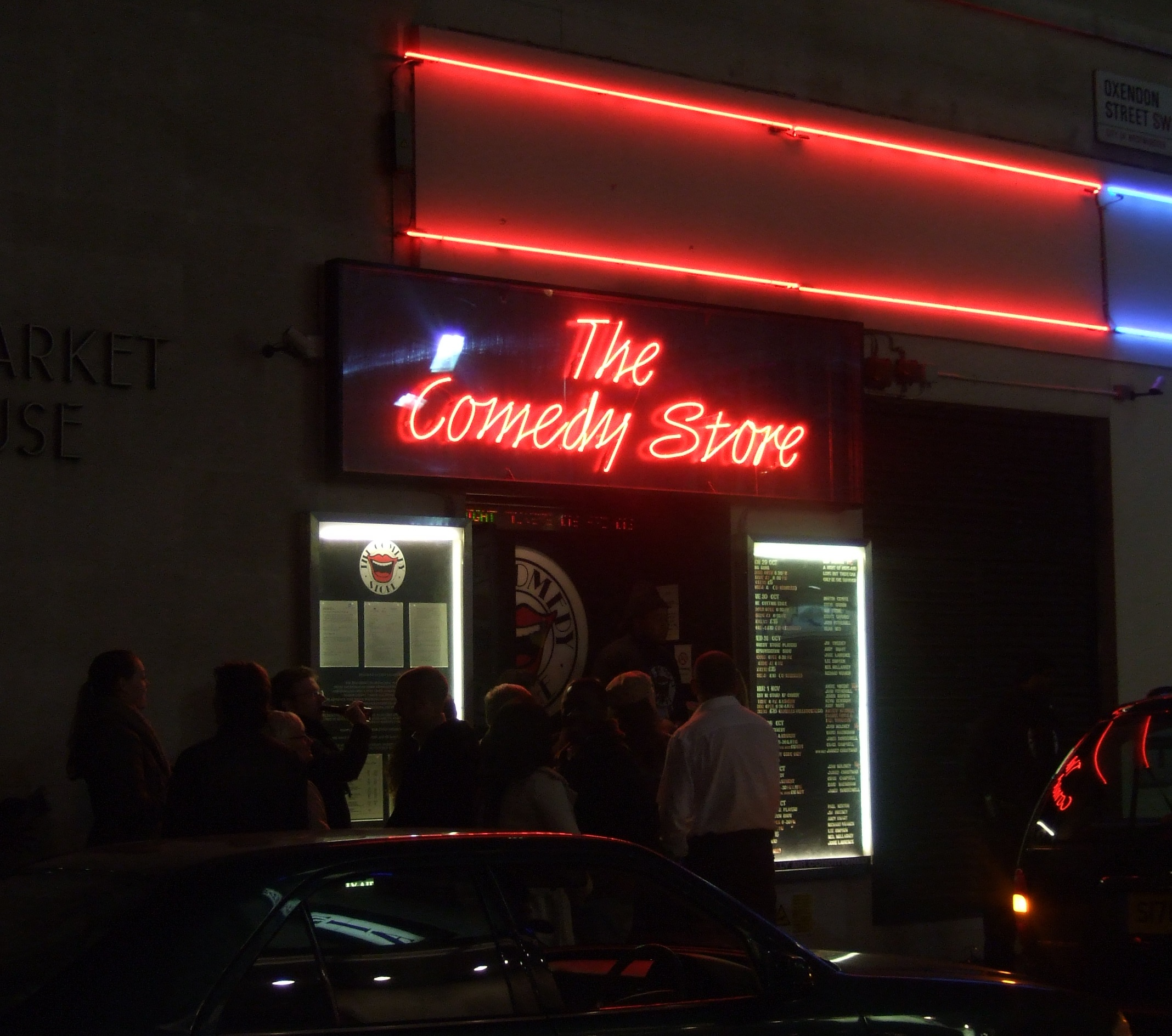
- Interactive map of The Comedy Store
- Location: Soho; London, W1; England; United Kingdom
- Coordinates: 51°30′36″N 0°7′56″W
- Owner: Don Ward and Peter Rosengard
- Type: Comedy club

Construction
- Opened: 1979; 47 years ago

Website
- thecomedystore.co.uk

The Comedy Store is a comedy club located in Soho, London, England. It was opened in 1979 by Don Ward and Peter Rosengard.

== Early history ==
Since 16 January 1925, David Pax Tennant's Gargoyle private members' club had leased the three top floors of 69 Dean Street, Soho, London (at the corner with Meard Street). In 1952, Tennant sold the Gargoyle as a going concern for £5,000 to caterer John Negus. In 1955, the club was sold to Michael Klinger and Jimmy Jacobs, who relaunched it as a strip club called the Nell Gwynne (variously advertised as a theatre, club, or revue). A 1960s ad shows the club as the Nell Gwynne by day and the Gargoyle Club at night.

== The Comedy Store ==
In 1978, Peter Rosengard was on holiday with his wife Irkku in Los Angeles.

"We had nothing to do one night, so I asked the concierge and he recommended the Comedy Store. At the time there was no live comedy in the UK, apart from working men's clubs up north, which was not really my scene. I loved what I saw in LA, so decided to open one in London, despite everybody telling me I was nuts."

In 1979, the Gargoyle's upper rooms took in a varied series of weekly themed club-nights, in addition to the long-running Nell Gwynne Revue strip show. Don Ward said Rosengard could use his premises on Saturday nights. But it was also a strip club with topless barmaids, which Peter had to explain when comedians came to audition.

On Saturdays, beginning 19 May 1979, in the Gargoyle's rooftop club space Hammersmith-born insurance salesman Peter Rosengard started a weekly club-night on Saturdays called the Comedy Store, in partnership with comedian Don Ward. It was open mic, in a Gong Show format, and invited audiences to show approval or disapproval of the unknown acts performing by "gonging" them off. There was no toilet in the dressing room, and male and female comedians used the sink.

"On 19 May 1979, only sixteen days after Margaret Thatcher’s first general election victory, a new comedy club opened in London, hosted in a Soho topless bar named the Gargoyle, accessed through the Nell Gwynne strip club in Dean Street. The Comedy Store was the brainchild of insurance salesman Peter Rosengard, who teamed up with local businessman Don Ward, having been inspired by the Los Angeles Comedy Store while on holiday."

"In the old days, there was a cross-over between stripping and comedy. 69 Dean Street was the Nell Gwynne strip club until about 11 o’clock and then it suddenly turned into The Comedy Store. When it got successful, they stopped doing the stripping on Friday and Saturday and they did two comedy shows – an 8 o’clock and a midnight. If you were on the circuit then, you’d do first act in the first house at the Comedy Store, then go off and do a pub in Stoke Newington or wherever, then rush back and do second or third on the bill in the second show at the Comedy Store. If you were good, you were working in more than one place. Everyone worked round each other and there was a cross-over between street acts and alternative acts"
Philip Herbert

== Careers ==
The London Comedy Store made the reputations of many of the UK's upcoming "alternative comedians" while the specifically political Alternative Cabaret was taking root.

Among the original line-up who made their reputations here were Alexei Sayle, Rik Mayall, Adrian Edmondson, French & Saunders, Nigel Planer and Peter Richardson who in 1980 led these pioneers to establish the breakaway Comic Strip team elsewhere in Soho. All were to prove influential in reshaping British television comedy throughout the 1980s as stars of The Comic Strip Presents.

The Comedy Store, at the Gargoyle and elsewhere, helped start the careers of Paul Merton, Ben Elton, Keith Allen, Jo Brand, Mark Thomas, Arnold Brown, Andrew Bailey, Pat Condell and John Sparkes.

Comedian Paul Merton is one of the longest performing mainstream comics to still be associated with the venue from his debut performance in 1984. He presented a BBC 1 documentary, 25 Years of the Comedy Store – A Personal History by Paul Merton (11 January 2005).

In 2016 British artist Carl Randall painted the portrait of comedian Jo Brand standing in front of The Comedy Store, as part of the artist's 'London Portraits' series, where he asked various cultural figures to choose a place in London for the backdrop of their portraits. In an interview Brand explained why she chose The Comedy Store for her portrait, and her experiences performing there early in her career.

== Groups ==
In October 1985, an improvisational group called The Comedy Store Players was formed, consisting of Mike Myers, Neil Mullarkey, Kit Hollerbach, Dave Cohen and Paul Merton. The group has had several line-up changes over the years, and now features a rotating team of Neil Mullarkey, Josie Lawrence, Richard Vranch and Lee Simpson, together with frequent guest appearances. Jim Sweeney was a member until retiring from performance in 2008 due to multiple sclerosis. Andy Smart was a member until his death in May 2023. Several of The Comedy Store Players appeared on the BBC Radio 4 and Channel 4 comedy game show Whose Line Is It Anyway?.

In 1990 The Cutting Edge satirical comedy team was formed by comedy journalist John Connor (formerly comedy editor at radical London listings magazine City Limits). The original team was Mark Thomas, Kevin Day, Bob Boyton, Nick Revell and Richard Morton. The show's aim was to recapture the political edge that was fostered at the original Comedy Store.

== Venues ==
Don Ward dissolved his business relationship with Rosengard in late 1981. Ward remained CEO of Comedy Store interests.

In 1982 when the upper floors were sold off, the Comedy Store moved to a series of other venues. In late 1982, The Comedy Store operated from 28a Leicester Square (The 400 Club) for two years, taking over the club in 1985.

In 1993, The Store moved to a specifically designed stand-up comedy venue, at 1a Oxendon Street, between Piccadilly Circus and Leicester Square.

In 1984 Rosengard went on to manage the band Curiosity Killed the Cat.

The Comedy Store also has sister venues in Manchester (opened in 2000), and Bournemouth (2006). There was also a venue at the Merrion Centre in Leeds which opened in November 2003 but closed in June 2004.
