= The 400 Club =

Coordinates: 51.5102°N 0.1294°W

The 400 Club was a night club at 28a Leicester Square, in the West End of London.

The building was originally home to the Cranbourne Club, then part of it became a cinema in 1909, with a basement tearoom. In 1914, it became Cupid's Cinema and in 1926, the Palm Court Cinema, but closed in 1928 in the face of mounting competition. It later became a restaurant, before it was the 400 Club.

For two decades the 400 Club catered to "the upper classes at night time".

During the Second World War, the 400 Club was frequented by people in the armed forces. These included Battle of Britain pilots, one of whom, Brian Kingcome, recollected in his memoirs spending time at " . . . the Four Hundred, whose dimly lit dance floor and seductive music were excellent backdrops for young men in uniform trying their luck with the 'I'm off to war tomorrow and may never come back' routine . . . "

There was an 18-piece orchestra, and the club was a favourite of Princess Margaret from the early 1950s, with the table used by her and her friends being known as "The Royal Box".

Until 1957, the 400 required gentlemen patrons to wear a dinner jacket.

In the 1970s, the club became Adam's, an upscale gay cub, then Subway, a sleazy gay disco that was closed down by Westminster City Council, then the Comedy Store. In 1992, the cinema became part of the Wetherspoon's pub The Moon under Water, with the basement a nightclub called Storm and later Club Koo. It has since been bought by Simmons, a popular chain of bars in London.
