= Alternative comedy =

Style of comedy

Alternative comedy is a term coined in the 1980s for a style of comedy that makes a conscious break with the mainstream comedic style of an era. The phrase has had different connotations in different contexts: in the UK, it was used to describe content that was an "alternative" to the mainstream stand-up of the day (which took place in working men's clubs and was characterised by unoriginal gags often containing elements of sexism and racism). In other contexts, it is the nature of the form that is "alternative", avoiding reliance on a standardised structure of a sequence of jokes with punch lines. Patton Oswalt has defined it as "comedy where the audience has no pre-set expectations about the crowd, and vice versa. In comedy clubs, there tends to be a certain vibe—alternative comedy explores different types of material."

In an interview with The A.V. Club after his performance in the 2011 comedy drama film Young Adult, Oswalt stated:

I had come up out of that whole alternative scene, which was all about, "Don't try it, man. Just go up and wing it." I think a lot of that comes from insecurity. It's that fashion of improv and amateurism that comes from the insecurity of saying to the audience, "Well, it doesn't matter if it doesn't go well, because I didn't even try that hard to begin with." It's like, "Oh, that's why you're not [trying]. If you actually tried hard and it sucked, then you've got to blame yourself." So that's what makes it hard for some people to sit down and actually just do the fucking work, because doing the work means you're making a commitment.

== United Kingdom ==
Alternative comedy had a number of influences. It was a reaction against the mainstream stand-up of the day (which took place in working men's clubs and was characterised by unoriginal gags often containing elements of sexism and racism). Positive influences include American 'sick' comedians of the 1950s and 1960s, like Mort Sahl and Lenny Bruce; the 1960s comedian John Paul Joans, who had been influenced by Bruce; the punk scene of the late 1970s; poets like John Cooper Clarke; and less conventional earlier comedians like Billy Connolly and John Dowie.

=== Comedy Store ===
The beginning of alternative comedy is commonly associated with the opening of the Comedy Store club in London on 19 May 1979, initially a weekly gong show-style comedy night in a room above a strip club in Soho. The official history of the club credits comedian and author Tony Allen with coining the term. However, in his autobiography, the late Malcolm Hardee claims to have coined the term in 1978.

Alternative comedy came to describe an approach to stand-up comedy that was neither racist nor sexist, defining itself against more traditional comedians playing the Northern working men's clubs who often relied on jokes targeting women and minorities in a form of comedy "civil war". (This divide was not absolute, with some performers from that circuit performing at the Comedy Store from its opening in May 1979.) What developed from these clashes was, in Arthur Smith's words, "comedy's version of punk".

Alexei Sayle, the Comedy Store's first MC, provided angry character comedy satirising the left. Arnold Brown, an older stand-up comic noted for his quick-witted, observational style, was revered by several alternative comedians, and would become a regular fixture at The Comedy Store. Fellow MC Tony Allen broke the taboos of personal and sexual politics, while Keith Allen confronted audiences in a fearless series of "put-ons" and was a big influence on the early cabaret scene that was about to emerge. As these newer comics grew in confidence, Tony Allen and Alexei Sayle founded Alternative Cabaret, with other Comedy Store regulars. Their aim was to establish several alternative comedy clubs in London in addition to their flagship venue at the Elgin, Ladbroke Grove, from August 1979. Its core members were Jim Barclay, Andy De La Tour, and Pauline Melville, stand-ups who shared a background in radical fringe theatre. The pair also brought alternative stand-up to the Edinburgh Festival for the first time in August 1980 with "Late Night Alternative" at the Heriot-Watt Theatre. Returning with a full show in 1981, "Alternative Cabaret" was the critical comedy hit of that year.

=== Alternative Cabaret ===
The Comedy Store now advertised itself as "The Home of Alternative Comedy" in London's weekly Entertainment Guide, Time Out, listing "Alternative Cabaret" as its main show. Their tours established the idea of running comedy shows in small venues around London, and sowed the seeds of the network of pub-based gigs that grew in the capital and across the UK throughout the 1980s. The new comedy got its own section, "Cabaret", in Listings magazines, first in City Limits followed by Time Out on 21 January 1983. Other organisations, comics, and entrepreneurs—including Maria Kempinska's Jongleurs and Roland and Clare Muldoon's CAST/New Variety—added more regular venues, bringing the number of gigs per week from 24 in 1983 to 69 by 1987.

=== The Comic Strip ===
Meanwhile, another group of comics left the Comedy Store with Peter Richardson to form The Comic Strip and run their own "Comedy Cabaret" shows at the Boulevard Theatre, Walkers Court, Soho in October 1980. The Comic Strip, featuring double acts and sketch comedy, consisted of Manchester University and Royal Central School graduates Ade Edmondson, Rik Mayall, Nigel Planer, Dawn French, and Jennifer Saunders, who began to aim their talents at television. As The Comic Strip Presents, the group made over 40 television films for both Channel 4 and BBC.

Ben Elton, who had by then become the Comedy Store's next MC, was invited by Rik Mayall to join him as co-writer of BBC2's TV hit sitcom The Young Ones. It was then as MC of Channel 4's new comedy show Saturday Live that Elton found fame as a performer in his own right. As author William Cook noted, "After The Young Ones made him Alternative Comedy's hidden voice, Saturday Live (Channel 4) made him its most visible face."

Comic and broadcaster Arthur Smith observed that "If Tony Allen, 'The Godfather of Alternative Comedy', was the theory of anarchic comedy, then Malcolm Hardee was its cock-eyed embodiment". Hardee was the much loved MC at the Tunnel Palladium, The Mitre, Deptford 1984-89 whose audience were famous for their vocal participation and wit. There he influenced the early careers of Vic Reeves and Bob Mortimer, Simon Day, Chris Lynam, Martin Soan, Harry Enfield, and many others to whom he gave their first gigs. He also found fame himself as part of The Greatest Show on Legs, which had been started by Martin Soan, his part in the legendary "Naked Balloon Dance" as well as his many shows and pranks at The Edinburgh Festival.

Just about every major British stand-up comedian in the last thirty years started their career in alternative comedy clubs, including Ben Elton, Jo Brand, Jack Dee, Lee Evans, Eddie Izzard, Harry Hill, Peter Kay, Jimmy Carr, and Ross Noble.

=== Contemporary alternative comedy in the United Kingdom ===
Alternative comedy has enjoyed a resurgence in the UK since about 2010, with Stewart Lee promoting the liberal, progressive values of the 1980s alternative comedy scene through his writing, live shows featuring veteran alternative comedians including Alexei Sayle and Norman Lovett, as well as a Comedy Central TV series showcasing a great variety of alternative acts, The Alternative Comedy Experience. Younger acts have banded together into groups dedicated to alternative comedy, including The Alternative Comedy Memorial Society and The Weirdos Collective.

== United States ==
=== New York City ===
In New York City, much of what is called alternative or "downtown comedy" is performed outside of traditional comedy clubs in theatres, such as Upright Citizens Brigade Theatre (UCB), Magnet Theater, The Creek and The Cave, and the Peoples Improv Theater (PIT), as well as cabarets that host comedy only occasionally. The comedians at these shows offer character-based humour or surreal humour, as opposed to observations of everyday life or more polemical themes. In addition, many alternative comics such as Demetri Martin and Slovin and Allen use unusual presentation styles, opting to play music, give PowerPoint presentations, or act out sketches. Many alternative comics such as Sarah Silverman, Janeane Garofalo, and Todd Barry also perform in mainstream comedy venues. The now-defunct Luna Lounge in Manhattan's Lower East Side was home to a celebrated weekly alternative comedy stand-up series called "Eating It" from 1995 to 2005, co-created by Garofalo, which featured a changing line-up including herself, Silverman, Barry, Louis CK, Jim Norton, Ted Alexandro, H. Jon Benjamin, Greg Giraldo, Patrice O'Neal, Patton Oswalt, Sarah Vowell, Mike Birbiglia, Marc Maron, Dave Chappelle, Roseanne Barr, and numerous others, until the property was sold and the building razed.

Eugene Mirman started a show called "Invite Them Up" at Rififi, a bar in Manhattan's East Village in 2002. The popular weekly show, co-hosted by Bobby Tisdale, never advertised or listed its performers. Comedians such as Demetri Martin, Aziz Ansari, Pete Holmes, Jon Glaser, Jon Daly, Reggie Watts, and musicians such as Bright Eyes and Yo La Tengo all performed on "Invite Them Up". The show spurred a host of other weekly events at Rififi hosted by Nick Kroll, John Mulaney, Greg Johnson, Larry Murphy, and Jenny Slate. The venue was a hotbed of alternative comedy until complaints from neighbors about one of Rififi's dance parties, Trash, got the bar closed down in 2008.

Warren St. John said that the "inspiration" for alternative comedy in New York City is the Upright Citizens Brigade. The group originally formed at the Upright Citizens Brigade Theatre in Chelsea in 1999. Four years later, in 2003, several performers at the UCB spun off their own theater, and formed the PIT. St. John also argues that one reason why unusual comics can succeed in New York City is that they don't have to tour part-time, as many of them also work as writers on local comedy television shows such as The Daily Show and the Late Show with David Letterman.

=== Los Angeles ===
Patton Oswalt cited Dana Gould as the originator of the alternative comedy scene in the early nineties, who also cites Janeane Garofalo as another progenitor of the scene. Beth Lapides started the Un-Cabaret shows, which was the flagship of the alternative comedy movement. Other contemporaries of the scene included Bob Odenkirk, David Cross, Greg Behrendt, Andy Kindler, and Kathy Griffin.

Oswalt was essential in pioneering the alternative comedy on the West Coast. He created The Comedians of Comedy tour, which played across the US in independent music venues intermittently from 2004 to 2008. The original tour was hosted by Oswalt, and featured Maria Bamford, Zach Galifianakis, and Brian Posehn.

== Australia ==
The Experimental Comedy Club in Perth, Western Australia was founded by Xavier Susai of Grassroots Comedy, during the COVID-19 pandemic, as a safe space for comedians to try new styles and material, without being perceived as an audition for professional comedy nights. Visiting comedians from around the world such as Mark Normand and Stephen K. Amos have dropped in to perform at this room.

== Canada ==
Canada has a history of embracing alternative stand-up and sketch comedy. The ALTdot COMedy Lounge has been running for more than 20 years at The Rivoli, where The Kids in the Hall also had a residency in the mid-1980s. Other notable alternative comedy shows now defunct included Pirate Video Cabaret (ended 2003), Laugh Sabbath and The Second City Theater Toronto's Sketchy at Best. Other notable alt acts include Terry Clement, Sean Cullen, Jon Dore, Paul Irving, Chris Locke, Levi Macdougall, Ron Sparks and Harland Williams.

== South Africa ==
While South African comedy often comprises racial or stereotype-based humour, alternative comedy in South Africa tends to avoid such subject matter. It is hard to define alternative comedy, but subject matter may include taboo, dark, non sequitur, geek, and various other topics, whilst excluding racial, scatological, stereotype, South Africanised humour and other topics considered mainstream. Although comedians of this genre may include mainstream topics, it does not form the majority of their sets.

It is hard to say exactly where it started, but The Underground in Melville Johannesburg was known for its risqué humour proliferated by founder John Vlismas. The Comedy Underground was fertile development ground for alternative humour with its anything goes policy. Since its closure in 2010, alternative comedy has found new venues including Foxwood theatre, Picollinos, and various others. Johannesburg remains the home of South African alternative.

One of the driving forces behind the increasing prominence of alternative comedy is the Johannesburg Comedy Cartel, whose members include Shaun Wewege, Warren Robertson, Vittorio Leonardi, and Alyn Adams. Other South African comedians who fall into the genre include Dale Amler, Roni Modimola, Mark Banks, and Vlismas.

Mel Miller is arguably considered one of the pioneers of the alternative genre in South Africa. During the Apartheid era, Miller's material was considered "inappropriate" or radical, resulting in more than one run-in and detention with the South African Bureau of State Security.

== See also ==
- The Comic Strip
- UnCabaret
- The Comedy Store (London)
- Alternative Cabaret
- Saturday Live
- Luna Lounge
- The ALTdot COMedy Lounge
