= Dean Street =

Street in Soho, London, United Kingdom

Coordinates: 51°30′50″N 0°07′58″W

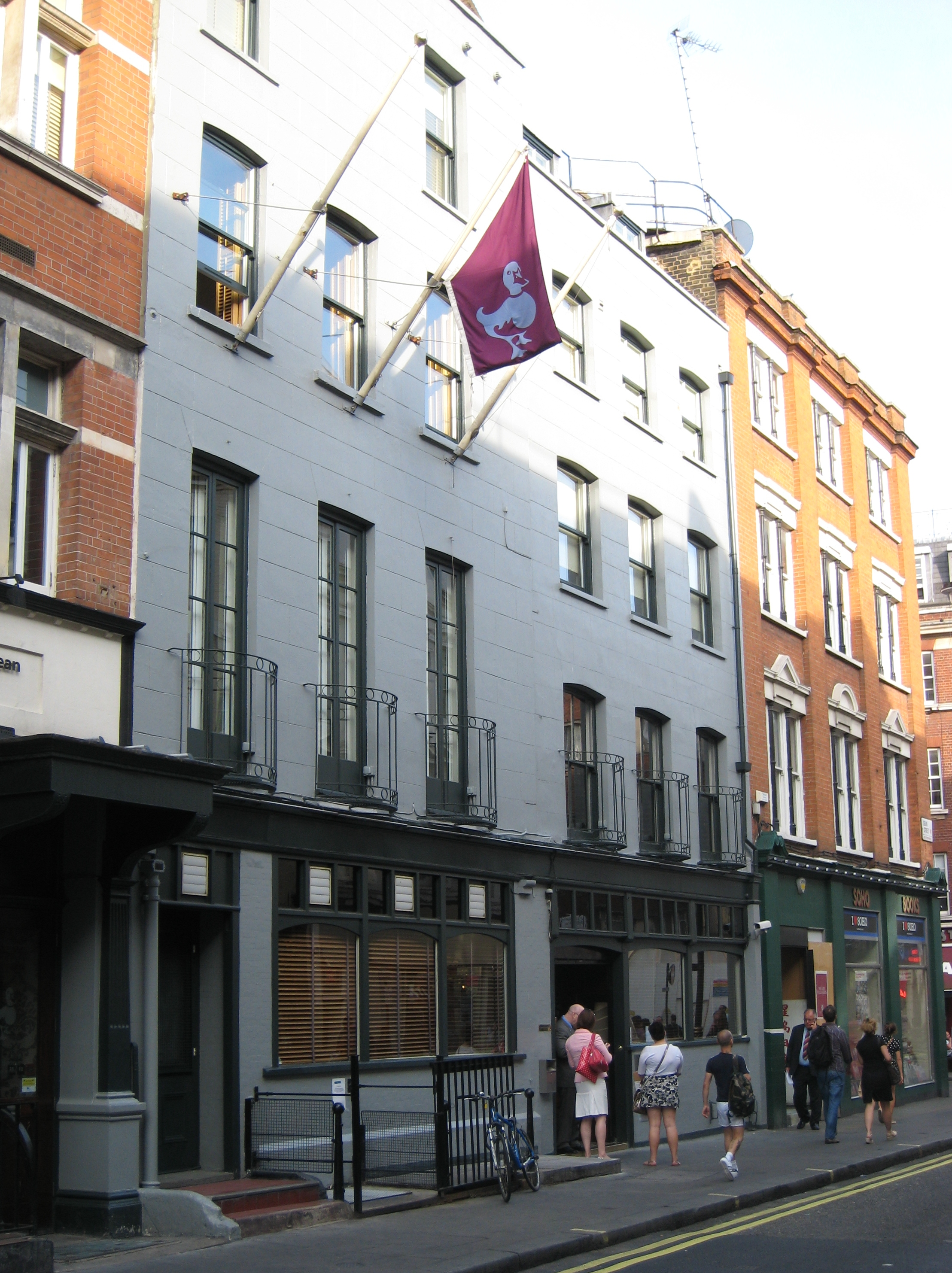
The Groucho Club on Dean Street

Dean Street is a street in Soho, central London, running from Oxford Street south to Shaftesbury Avenue. It crosses Old Compton Street and is linked to Frith Street by Bateman Street.

== History ==
=== Origins ===
Dean Street was built in 1681 in what was then open countryside; the designation Soho has been attributed to So-ho! a hare-hunting cry mentioned in Shakespeare. At first the new residential area attracted the aristocracy, but waves of refugees came and by 1711 almost half the parish was French. According to Nick Black "Soho is the best preserved area of London. Its street pattern has hardly altered in 300 years".

=== Political residents ===
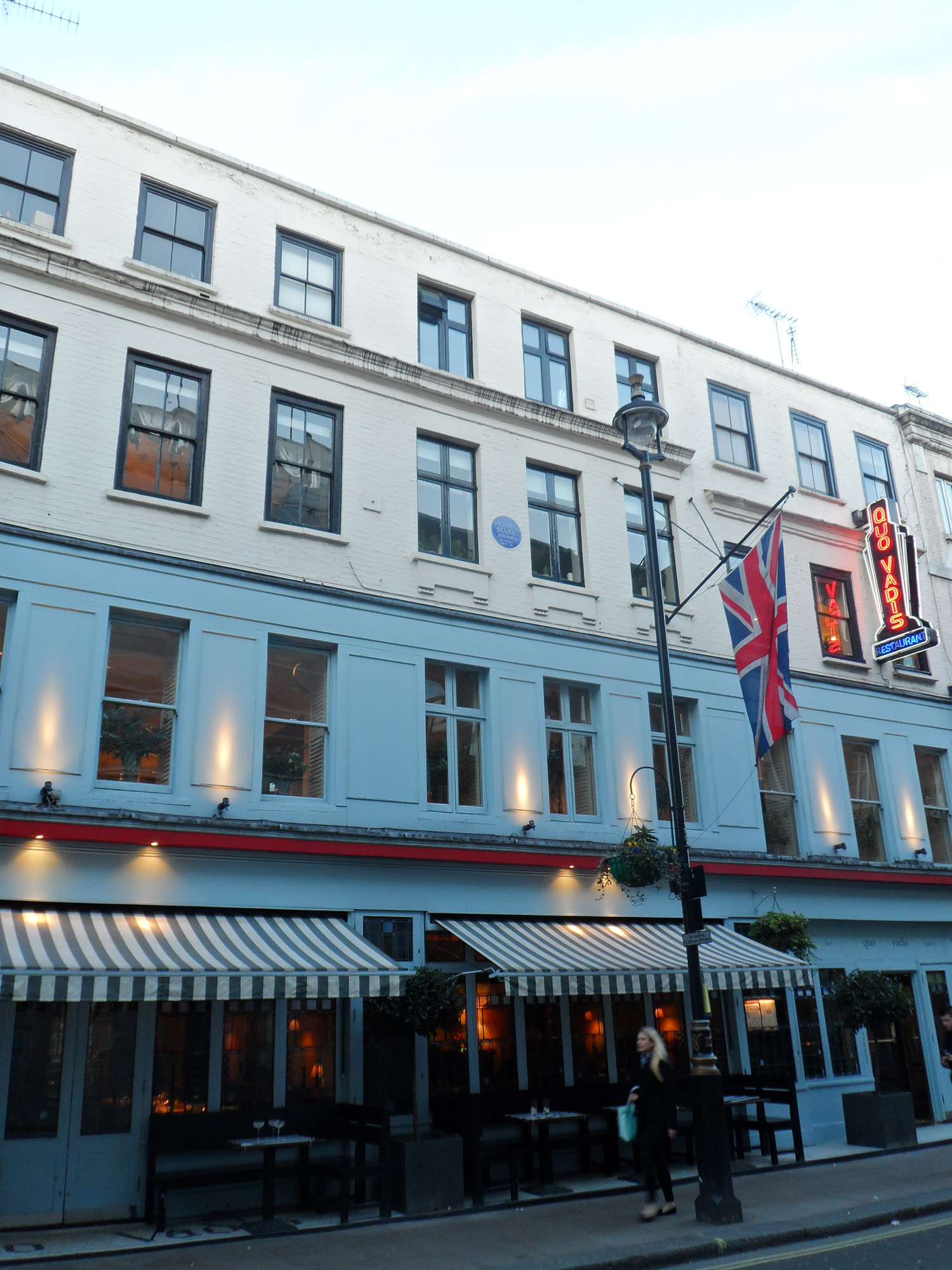
Karl Marx lived at 28 Dean Street

The French revolutionary Jacques Pierre Brissot for a time lived in poverty in Dean Street.

Later, so did Karl Marx. Early drafts of The Communist Manifesto were presented for discussion at Dean Street's Golden Lion pub by Marx and Engels.

A blue plaque at No. 28 commemorates his residence there during 1851-1856.

Alessandro Marocco, a central anarchist during the early years of illegalism and a member of the Intransigents of London and Paris, opened an umbrella shop at 160, Dean Street. This shop likely served as a place for him to fence goods stolen by illegalists during the 1880s and 1890s on the European continent. It was therefore likely a central hub for the early illegalists.

The French House at 39 Dean Street was, during World War II, the reputed headquarters of the French Resistance; it was then called the York Minster. General Charles de Gaulle is said to have composed his rallying speech "À tous les Français" there.

=== Medicine ===
As the nobility started to leave the area it attracted enterprising medical professionals. By 1821 Soho had three private schools of anatomy.

The last of the Lock Hospitals (places where people were hospitalised for venereal disease - they were the successors to the medieval leper or lazar houses) was in Dean Street. At first located in a house, a purpose-built institution was erected in 1912. The façade remains. Writing to the British Medical Journal in 1908, a doctor said:

venereal disease is rampant, not only in the army but even in our large centres. Those who doubt it should look at the queue which forms in Dean Street before the doors of the London Lock Hospital.

=== Parish Church ===
The parish church, St Anne's Church, Soho, is in Dean Street, and was consecrated in 1686. In 1892 its churchyard was dedicated as a public garden. There is buried William Hazlitt, as is the bankrupt King Theodore of Corsica, with this inscription:

EPITAPH

Near this place is interred
THEODORE, KING OF CORSICA,
who died in this parish
December XIth MDCCLVI
immediately after leaving
the King's Bench Prison
by the benefit of the Act of Insolvency
in consequence of which
he registered his kingdom of Corsica
for the use of his creditors

== Culture ==
The Soho Theatre presents new plays and stand-up comedy. The Gargoyle Club ran for 27 years in the upper floors at number 69, a site that also housed the nightclub Billy's in its cellars during the late 1970s, when it was associated with the New Romanticism movement.

== Fire ==
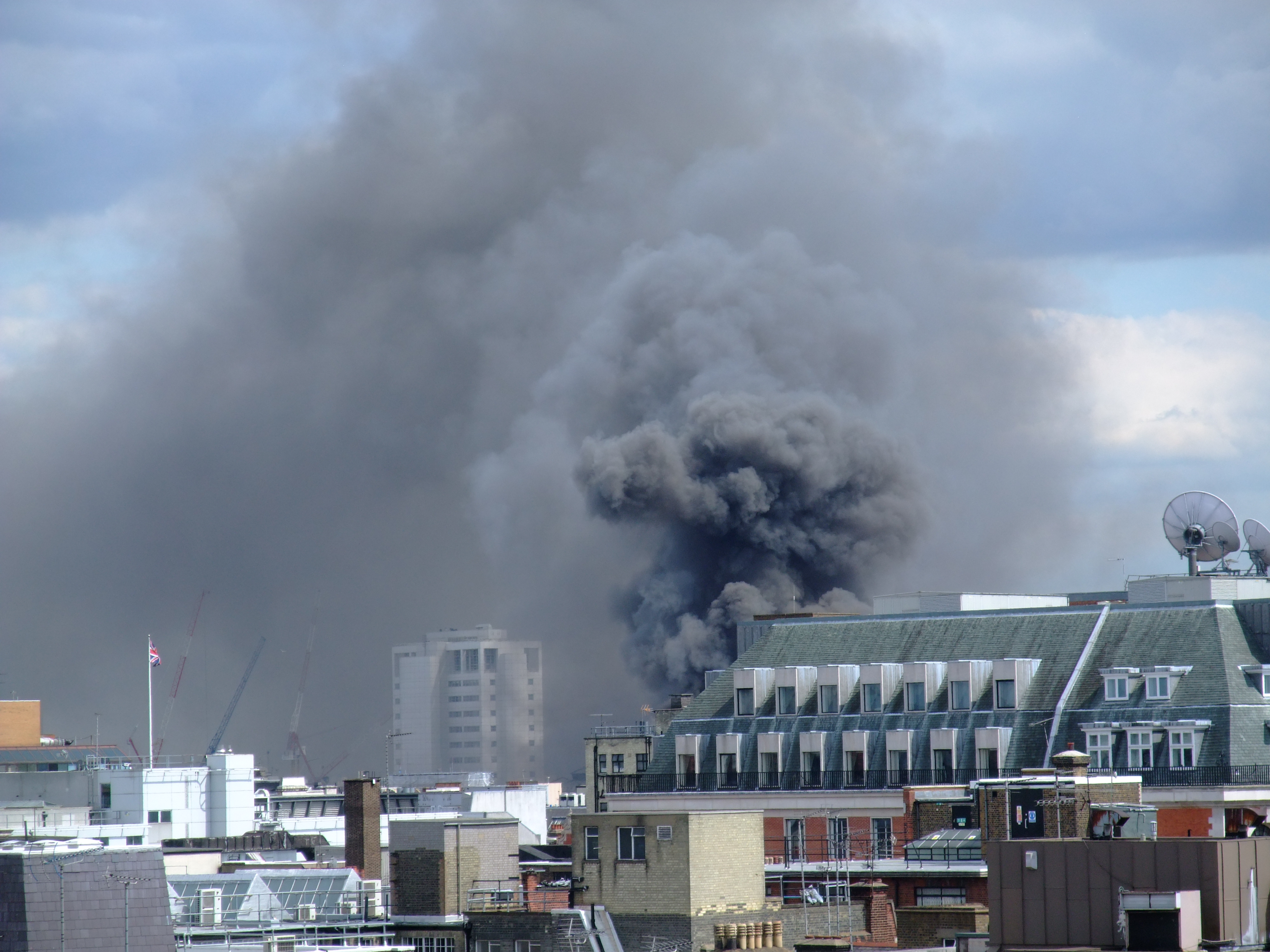
Dean Street fire on 10 July 2009

On 10 July 2009 a fire broke out on Dean Street. Two firefighters suffered minor injuries but nobody else was hurt. The building that caught fire was gutted.

== Intersections ==
From north to south:

- Oxford Street – terminates
- Carlisle Street
- St Anne's Court
- Richmond Buildings (leading to Richmond Mews)
- Chapone Place
- Bateman Street
- Meard Street
- Bourchier Street
- Old Compton Street
- Romilly Street
- Shaftesbury Avenue – terminates

== Bibliography ==
- Bantman, Constance (2007), Anarchismes et anarchistes en France et en Grande-Bretagne, 1880-1914 : Échanges, représentations, transferts [Anarchisms and Anarchists in France and Great Britain, 1880-1914: Exchanges, Representations, Transfers (PhD thesis)] (in French), Paris: Université Paris XIII
- Black, Nick (2006). "The challenging isle: a walk through Soho". British Medical Journal. 333 (7582): 1325–1326. JSTOR 40700597.
- Davranche, Guillaume (2024), "MAROCCO Alexandre [dit Martin, Marocq, Maroucq]", Dictionnaire des anarchistes (Le Maitron), Paris: Le Maitron des anarchistes
- Dotted Crotchet (1904). "Round About Soho". The Musical Times. 45 (732): 81–87. JSTOR 902846.
- Dupuy, Rolf (2025), "MAROCCO, Alexandre "MARTIN" ; "MAROCQ" ; "MAROUCQ"", Dictionnaire international des militants anarchistes, Paris
- Gibbs, Denis (2002). "Male Hospital in Dean Street: a last link with London Locks". Journal of the Royal Society of Medicine. 95 (9): 430.
- Luna, Frederick A. de (1991). "The Dean Street Style of Revolution: J.-P. Brissot, Jeune Philosophe". French Historical Studies. 17 (1): 159–190. JSTOR 286283.
- Purdy, J.S. (1908). "Natural and acquired immunity". British Medical Journal. 13 (1(2476): 1457–8.
- Tyler, Melissa (2020). Soho at Woek: Pleasure and Place in Contemporary London. Cambridge University Press. ISBN 9781316875704.
