= Meard Street =

Street in Soho, London

Coordinates: 51.5133°N 0.133°W

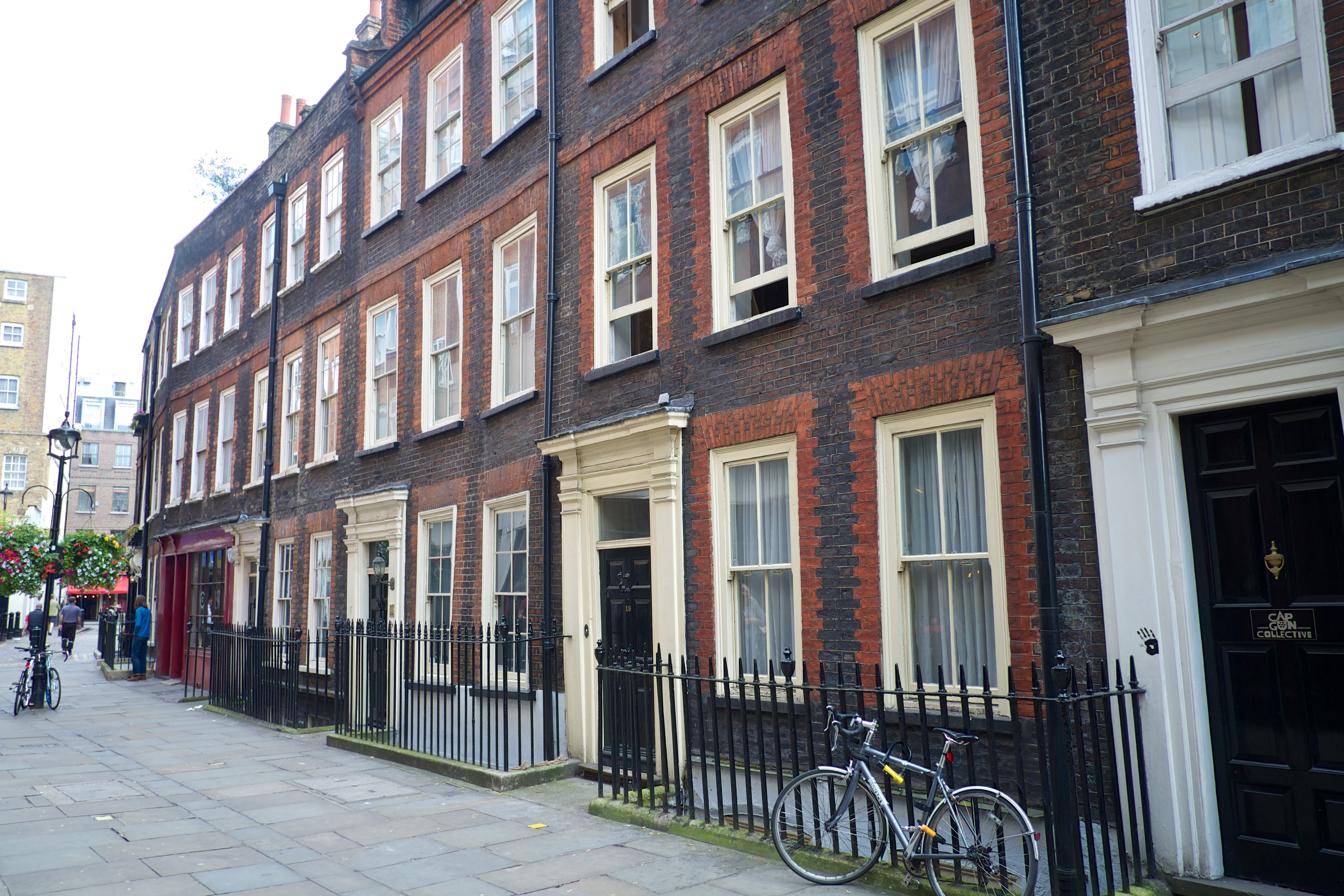
Houses in Meard Street

Meard Street is a street in Soho, London. It runs roughly east–west (properly, east-northeast to west-southwest, as elsewhere in Soho), between Wardour Street to the west and Dean Street to the east. It is in two sections, with a slight bend in the middle: the west half is pedestrianised, while the east half is a narrow, single-lane road.

The street is named after John Meard, the younger, a carpenter, later esquire, who developed it in the 1720s and 1730s.

It is prominently featured in photographs and postcards for the tourist trade, due to the pun with French: merde and Italian: merda ("shit").

15 Meard Street served as the exterior of the home occupied by characters played by Ian McKellen and Derek Jacobi in the 2013–16 ITV sitcom Vicious.

== History ==
The two halves occupy what were originally two separate, non-communicating 17th-century courts. They were developed in two halves: the western half, Meard's Court, in 1722, and the eastern half, Dean's Court (opening off Dean Street, and renamed Meard Street) in 1731/32. As part of the redevelopment of Dean's Court, the two halves were joined in 1732/33.

== Notable occupants ==
- Johann Christian Bach (1738–1782), German composer
- Carl Friedrich Abel (1723–1787), German composer and violist
- Vincent Novello (1781–1861), English music publisher and organist
- Anne Pigalle, chanteuse, artiste and Soho club night creator, lived at number 4 from 1985 to 1990

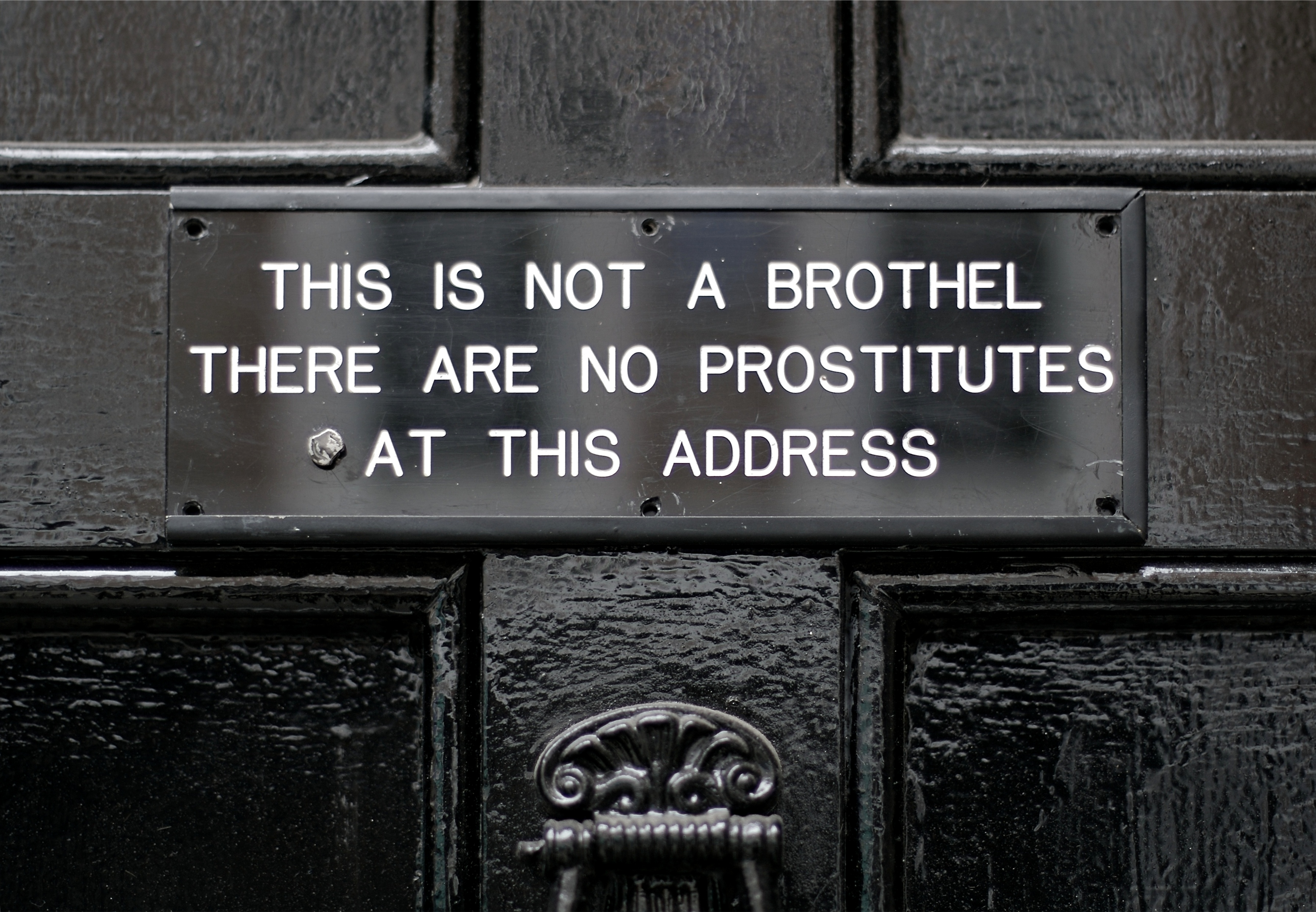
Sign at the entrance to the home of Sebastian Horsley

- Batcave, birthplace of English goth subculture
- Sebastian Horsley (1962–2010), artist and dandy; number 7

== See also ==
- St. Anne's Court

== References and sources ==
Sources

- Sheppard, F. H. W. (1966), "The Pitt Estate in Dean Street: Meard Street", Survey of London: volumes 33 and 34: St Anne Soho, pp. 238–246
