= Mary Rosse =

British photographer (1813–1885)

Mary Parsons, Countess of Rosse
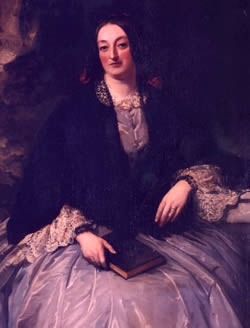
- Born: Mary Field; 14 April 1813; Heaton Hall, Bradford, UKGBI
- Died: 22 July 1885 (aged 72); 10 Connaught Place, London, UKGBI
- Occupations: Photographer; astronomer; blacksmith; architect
- Spouse: William Parsons, 3rd Earl of Rosse (m. 1836; died 1867)
- Children: 11, including Lawrence Parsons, 4th Earl of Rosse; Sir Charles Algernon Parsons
- Relatives: Katharine Parsons (daughter-in-law); Rachel Mary Parsons (granddaughter); William Parsons, 5th Earl of Rosse (grandson); Michael Parsons, 6th Earl of Rosse (great-grandson); Bridget Parsons (great-granddaughter); Desmond Parsons (great-grandson); Brendan Parsons, 7th Earl of Rosse {great-great-grandson)

Mary Parsons, Countess of Rosse (née Field; 14 April 1813 – 22 July 1885), known as Mary Rosse, was an Anglo-Irish photographer, astronomer, blacksmith, and architect, known for her expertise in waxed-paper negatives.

== Early life ==
Mary Field was born on 14 April 1813, at Heaton Hall, Bradford, England, to John Wilmer Field, a wealthy estate owner, and Ann Field (née Wharton-Myddleton; died 1815). She had a sister, Delia, and they were educated at home by Susan Lawson, a governess who encouraged the young Mary's creativity and broad interests, including astronomy. The sisters were joint heirs to their father's fortune.

Through her family, she met the future 3rd Earl of Rosse, then Lord Oxmantown (1800–1867), an Anglo-Irish astronomer and naturalist, and they were married on 14 April 1836. In February 1841, Lord Oxmantown succeeded his father in the family peerage to become The 3rd Earl of Rosse. They had married on 14 April 1836, her 23rd birthday. Mary, Baroness Oxmantown, thus now became The Countess of Rosse.

== Astronomy ==
In the early 1840s, the couple became interested in astronomy, and Mary Rosse helped her husband, Lord Rosse, build a number of giant telescopes, including the so-called Leviathan Telescope, which was considered a technical marvel in its time. The author, Henrietta Heald, contends that Rosse was not only a financial support to the building of the telescope, but that she also was involved in a practical and intellectual capacity. The Leviathan of Parsontown was completed in 1845 and held the record as the world's largest telescope for over 70 years, and was mentioned in Jules Verne’s science fiction novel, From the Earth to the Moon.

During the Great Famine of 1845–47 in Ireland, she was responsible for keeping over five hundred men employed in work in and around Birr Castle, where she and her husband lived.

She created a huge dining room at Birr Castle in which to entertain scientific guests, which became increasingly used when Lord Rosse became President of the Royal Society of London in 1848. Guests included mathematician William Hamilton, who wrote her a sonnet about his experience of gazing through the Leviathan.

== Photography ==
In 1842, Lord Rosse began experimenting in daguerreotype photography, possibly learning some of the art from his acquaintance William Henry Fox Talbot. In 1854, Lord Rosse wrote to Fox Talbot saying that Lady Rosse too had just commenced photography, and sent some examples of her work. Fox Talbot replied that some of her photographs of the telescope "are all that can be desired".

Lady Rosse became a member of the Dublin Photographic Society, and in 1859, she received a silver medal for "best paper negative" from the Photographic Society of Ireland. Many examples of her photography are in the Birr Castle Archives. Much of the topography of Birr Castle that she portrayed has changed very little, and it is possible to compare many of her photographs with the actual places. She recorded the Leviathan in her photographs, including one image showing her three sons, Clere, Randal, Charles, and her sister in law, Jane Knox, standing upright at the mouth of the telescope.

== Children ==
The Countess of Rosse gave birth to eleven children, but only four survived until adulthood:

- Lawrence Parsons, 4th Earl of Rosse (17 November 1840 – 30 August 1908)
- Reverend Randal Parsons (26 April 1848 – 15 November 1936)
- Hon. Richard Clere Parsons (21 February 1851 – 26 January 1923), apparently made a name for himself building railways in South America.
- Sir Charles Algernon Parsons (13 June 1854 – 11 February 1931), known for his commercial development of the steam turbine. His wife, Lady Katharine Parsons and their daughter Rachel Parsons were founders of the Women's Engineering Society and its first and second presidents.

== Death ==
On 22 July 1885, Mary, Dowager Countess of Rosse, died aged 72 at her home on 10 Connaught Place, London.
