= Mary Parsons =

Mary Parsons may refer to:

- Mary Bliss Parsons (1628–1712), American woman accused of witchcraft
- Mary Almera Parsons (1850–1944), American physician
- Mary Elizabeth Parsons (1859–1947), author of a guide to California wildflowers
- Mary Rosse, in full Mary Parsons, Countess of Rosse (1813–1885), British Irish amateur astronomer, architect, furniture designer, and photographer
- Mary Bridget Parsons (1907–1972), English socialite
- Mary Parsons Reid Allan (1917–2002), Scottish artist
