= NGC 1683 =

Spiral galaxy in the constellation Orion

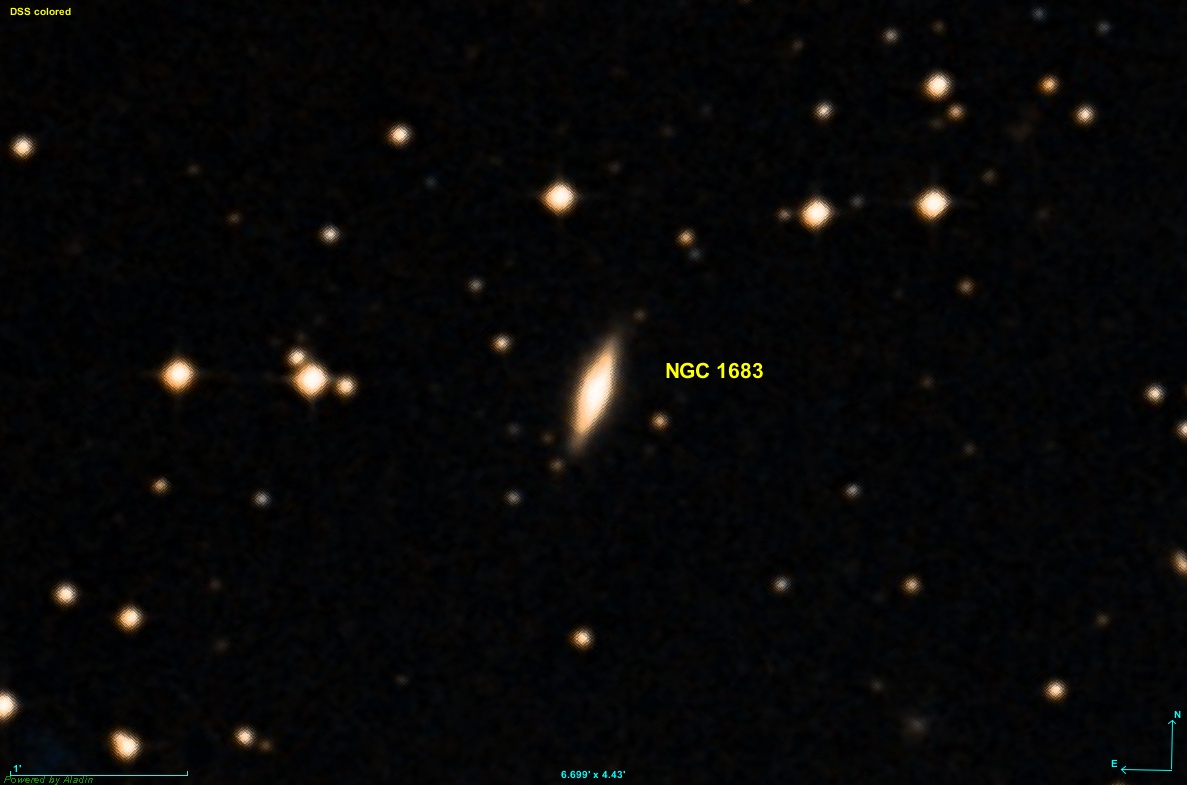
- DSS image of NGC 1683

Observation data (J2000 epoch)
- Constellation: Orion
- Right ascension: 04^{h} 52^{m} 17.639^{s}
- Declination: −03° 01′ 27.96″
- Redshift: 3941 km/s
- Heliocentric radial velocity: 0.013146
- Distance: 175.1 Mly (53.69 Mpc)
- Apparent magnitude (B): 15.58

Characteristics
- Type: Sa? pec sp
- Apparent size (V): 1.2′ × 0.4′

Other designations
- NGC 1683, PGC 16209

NGC 1683 is a spiral galaxy in the constellation Orion. The object was discovered in 1850 by the Irish astronomer William Parsons.

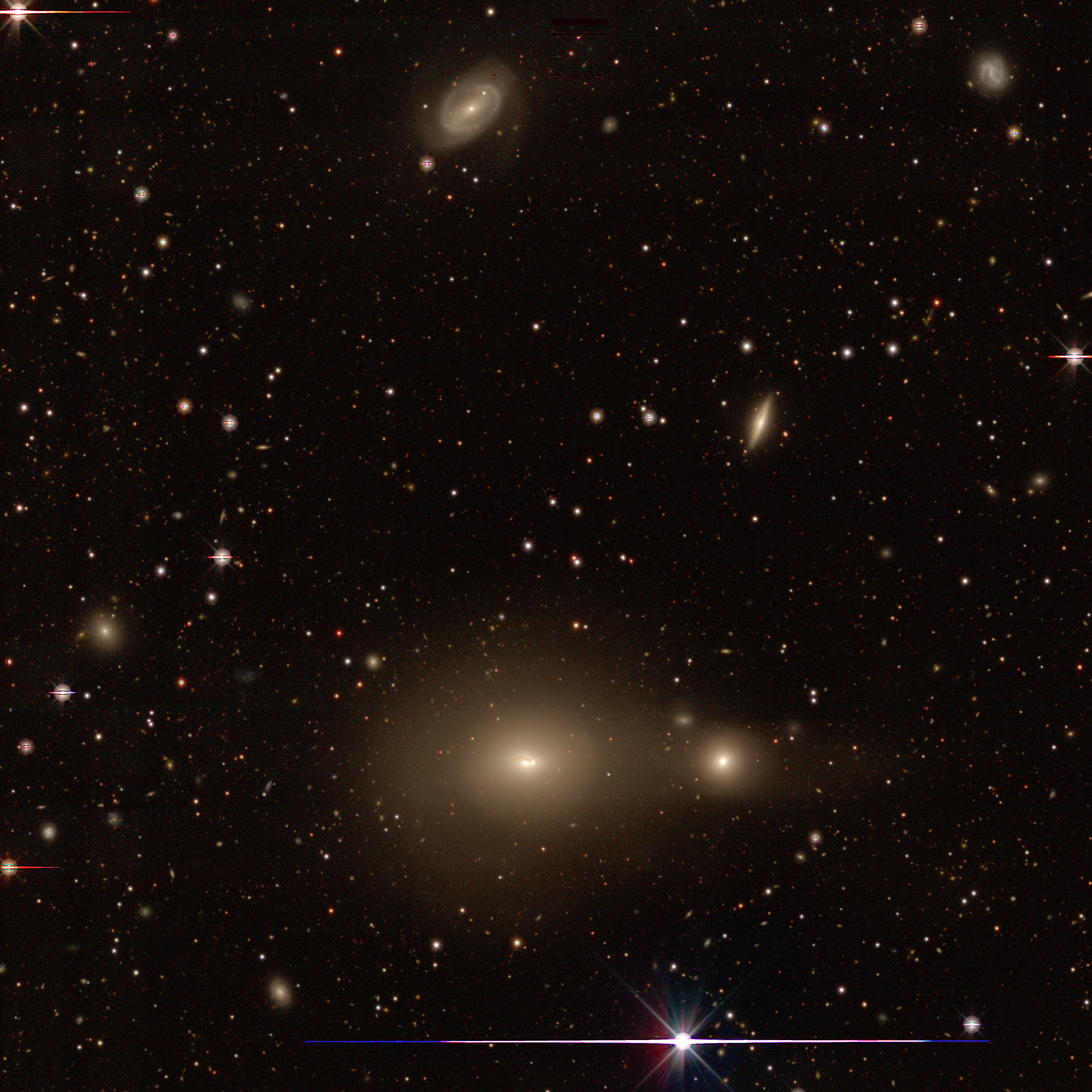
NGC 1682 to NGC 1685 with the legacy surveys. NGC 1683 is the small edge-on galaxy near the middle-right of the image.

== See also ==
- List of NGC objects
