= NGC 506 =

Star in the constellation Pisces

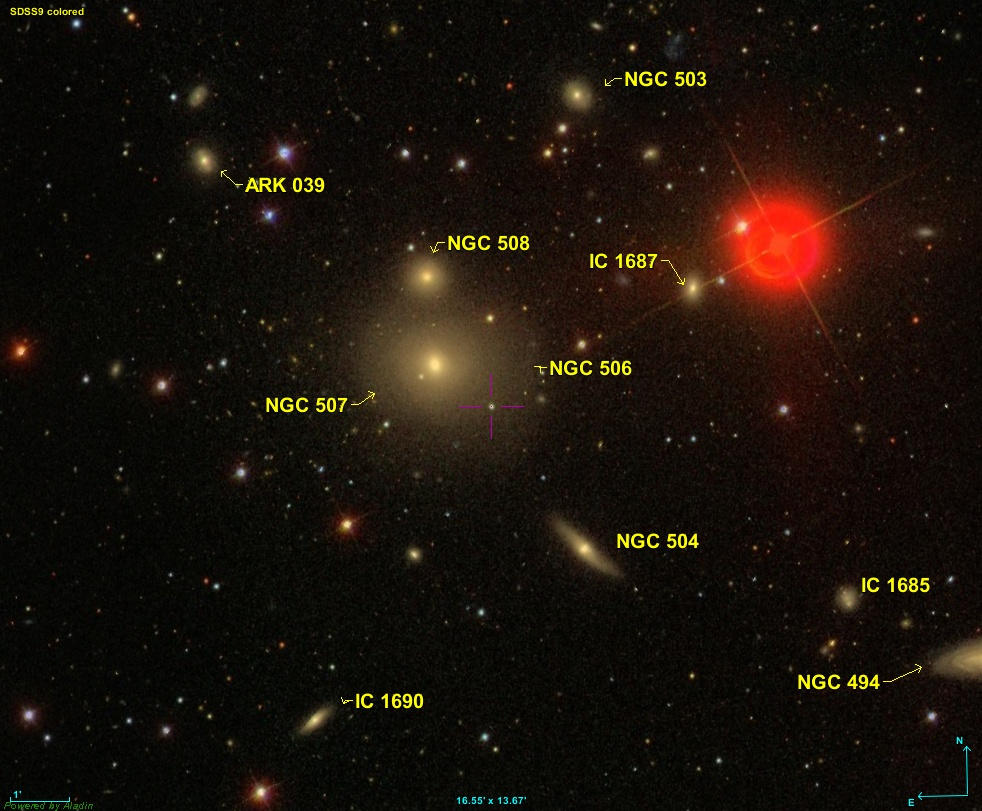
- NGC 506 as seen on Sloan Digital Sky Survey

Observation data Epoch J2000.0 Equinox ICRS
- Constellation: Pisces
- Right ascension: 01^{h} 23^{m} 35.5^{s}
- Declination: +33° 14′ 38″
- Apparent magnitude (V): 14.9

NGC 506 is a star in the constellation Pisces. It was discovered on 7 November 1874 by Lawrence Parsons, the 4th Earl of Rosse.

== Observation history ==
Lawrence discovered the object during his last observation of the NGC 499 Group. Though he noted no description, he gave a micrometric measure setting the object's position relative to a different nearby star. There is no object at this position, but the NGC position is corrected further southeast which leads to the assumption that John Louis Emil Dreyer, creator of the New General Catalogue, had additional information when he catalogued the star. In the catalogue, the object is described as "very faint, very small, southwest of NGC 507".

== See also ==
- Star
- List of NGC objects (1–1000)
- Pisces (constellation)
