= John Clere Parsons =

Anglo-Irish lawyer, politician and judge

John Clere Parsons (19 January 1760 – May 1826) was an Anglo-Irish lawyer, politician and judge.

== Biography ==
Parsons was the son of Sir William Parsons, 4th Baronet and Mary Clere. He was educated at Trinity College Dublin from 1778 and he entered the Middle Temple in 1781. He 1785 he entered King's Inns and he was called to the Irish Bar in 1792. In November 1805 he married Mary Anne Moore.

In 1818, Parsons was elected as the Member of Parliament for King's County on the interest of his elder brother, Lawrence Parsons, 2nd Earl of Rosse. He was re-elected in 1820. He rarely attended parliament in London and is not known to have voted or spoken in the Commons. He vacated his seat for his nephew, William Parsons, as soon as he came of age in June 1821. Soon after he was promoted to become a judge in Ireland. Parsons was liberal in his political outlook, being described as "all his life friendly to every concession to the Catholics".

Parliament of the United Kingdom
Preceded by Hardress Lloyd; Thomas Bernard	Member of Parliament for King's County; 1818–1821; With: Thomas Bernard	Succeeded by William Parsons; Thomas Bernard
