= Charles Algernon Parsons =

Anglo-Irish mechanical engineer and inventor (1854–1931)

The Honourable Sir Charles Parsons OM KCB FRS
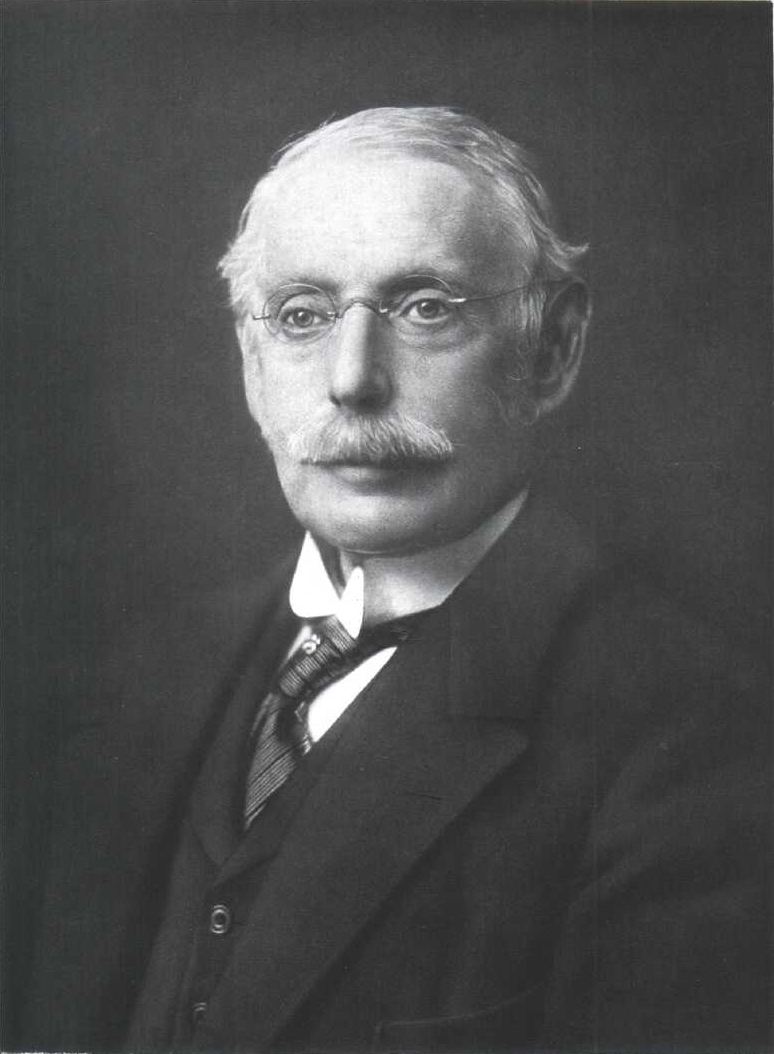
- Born: Charles Algernon Parsons; 13 June 1854; London, England
- Died: 11 February 1931 (aged 76); Duchess of Richmond
- Resting place: Church of St Bartholomew, Northumberland
- Education: Trinity College Dublin (B.A., 1871); St John's College, Cambridge (M.A., 1877)
- Occupations: Engineer; inventor
- Known for: Inventing the modern steam turbine (1884)
- Notable work: Turbinia (1894)
- Spouse: Katharine Bethell (m. 1883)
- Children: 2, including Rachel
- Parents: William Parsons, 3rd Earl of Rosse; Mary Field
- Relatives: Lawrence Parsons, 4th Earl of Rosse (brother)
- Awards: FRS (1898); Rumford Medal (1902); Albert Medal (1911); Bakerian Medal (1918); Franklin Medal (1920); Faraday Medal (1923); Kelvin Gold Medal (1926); Copley Medal (1928); Bessemer Gold Medal (1929)
- Honours: Order of the Bath (Knight Commander, 1911); Order of Merit (1927)
- Engineering career
- Discipline: Mechanical engineering
- Employers: C. A. Parsons and Company; Parsons Marine Steam Turbine Company
- Significant advance: Heat engine Steamship
- Awards: Engineering Heritage Award (1995)

Sir Charles Algernon Parsons (13 June 1854 – 11 February 1931) was an English mechanical engineer and inventor who designed the modern steam turbine in 1884. His invention revolutionised marine propulsion, and he was also the founder of C. A. Parsons and Company, developing and building Turbinia (1894), the first steam turbine-powered steamship.

He worked as an engineer on dynamo and turbine design, and power generation, with great influence in the naval and electrical engineering fields. He also helped develop optical equipment for searchlights and telescopes. Parsons received the Franklin Medal in 1920, the Faraday Medal in 1923, and the Copley Medal in 1928 for his work, as well as the Engineering Heritage Awards posthumously in 1995.

His inventions and developments were used in many appliances during the early 20th century, including both naval and optical devices. He was elected to the Royal Society in 1898, and he served as the president of the British Association between 1916 and 1919. For his lasting contributions, Parsons was knighted in 1911, and he became a member of the Order of Merit in 1927. He additionally received the Bessemer Gold Medal in 1929.

Parsons died in 1931 on board the Duchess of Richmond due to neuritis. He was buried at the church of St Bartholomew in Kirkwhelpington, Northumberland.

== Career and commercial activity ==
Parsons was born into an aristocratic Anglo-Irish family on 13 June 1854 in London as the youngest son of the astronomer William Parsons, 3rd Earl of Rosse. The family seat is Birr Castle, County Offaly, Ireland, and the town of Birr was called Parsonstown, after the family, from 1620 to 1901.

With his three brothers, Parsons was educated at home in Ireland by private tutors, including John Purser and Sir Robert Ball, all of whom were well versed in the sciences and also acted as practical assistants to the Earl in his astronomical work. Parsons then read mathematics at Trinity College Dublin, and at St. John's College, Cambridge, graduating from the latter in 1877 with a first-class honours degree. He joined the Newcastle-based engineering firm of W. G. Armstrong as an apprentice, an unusual step for the son of an earl. Later he moved to Kitsons in Leeds, where he worked on rocket-powered torpedoes.

=== Steam turbine engine ===
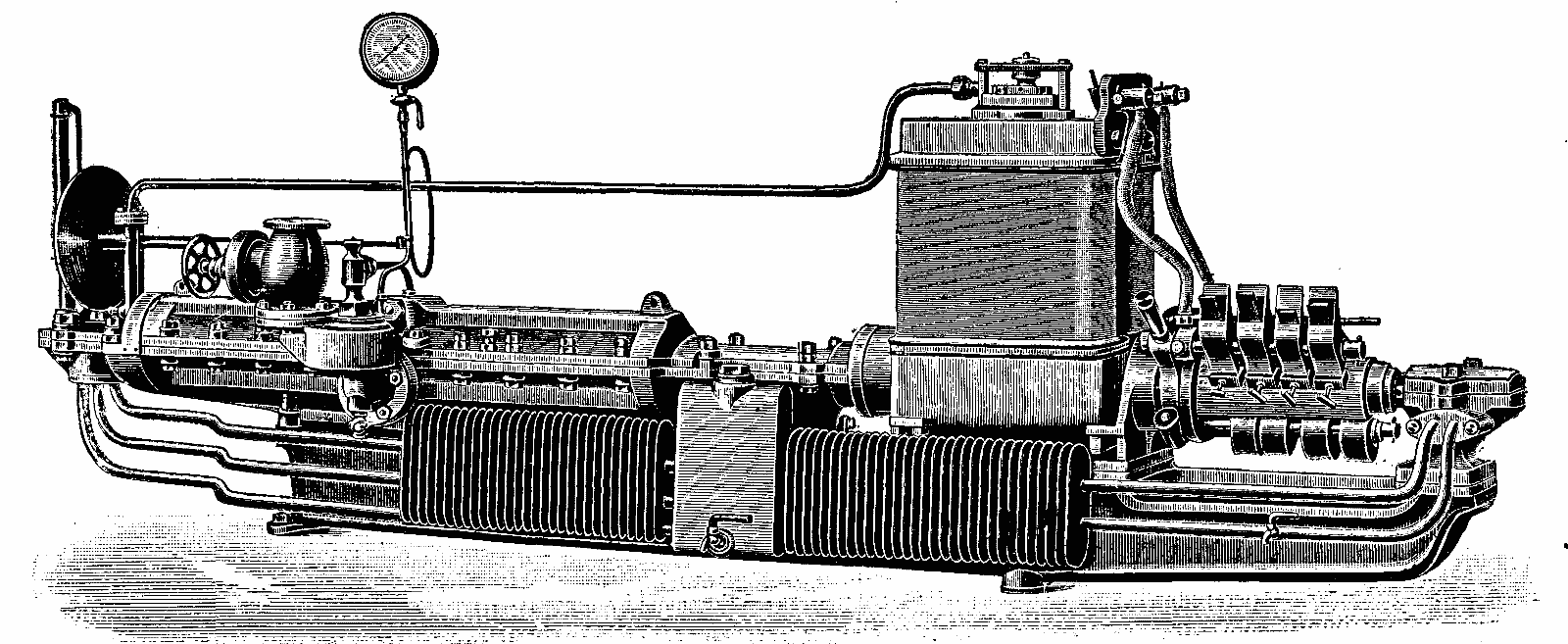
First compound steam turbine, built by Parsons in 1887

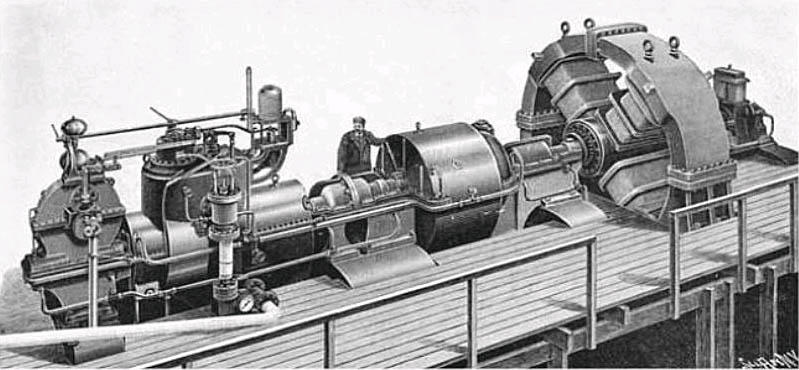
Parsons's first 1 MW turbogenerator built for the city of Elberfeld, Germany, in 1899 produced single-phase electricity at 4 kV

In 1884 Parsons moved to Clarke, Chapman and Co., ship-engine manufacturers operating near Newcastle, where he became head of their electrical-equipment development. He used Regnault's large collection of steam properties ("data of the physicists") to develop a turbine engine turning at 18,000 RPM in 1884 and immediately utilised the new engine to drive an electrical generator, which he also designed. Parsons's steam turbine made cheap and plentiful electricity possible and revolutionised marine transport and naval warfare.

Another type of steam turbine at the time, invented by Gustaf de Laval (1845–1913) in the 1880s, was an impulse design that subjected the mechanism to huge centrifugal forces and so had limited output due to the weakness of the materials available. Parsons explained in his 1911 Rede Lecture that his appreciation of the scaling issue led to his 1884 breakthrough on the compound steam turbine:

It seemed to me that moderate surface velocities and speeds of rotation were essential if the turbine motor was to receive general acceptance as a prime mover. I therefore decided to split up the fall in pressure of the steam into small fractional expansions over a large number of turbines in series, so that the velocity of the steam nowhere should be great...I was also anxious to avoid the well-known cutting action on metal of steam at high velocity.

=== Founding Parsons and Company ===
In 1889 he founded C. A. Parsons and Company in Newcastle to produce turbo generators to his design. In the same year he set up the Newcastle and District Electric Lighting Company (DisCo). In 1890, DisCo opened Forth Banks Power Station, the first power station in the world to generate electricity using turbo generators. In 1894 he regained certain patent rights from Clarke Chapman. Although his first turbine was only 1.6% efficient and generated a mere 7.5 kilowatts, rapid incremental improvements in a few years led to his first megawatt turbine, built in 1899 for a generating plant at Elberfeld in the German Empire.

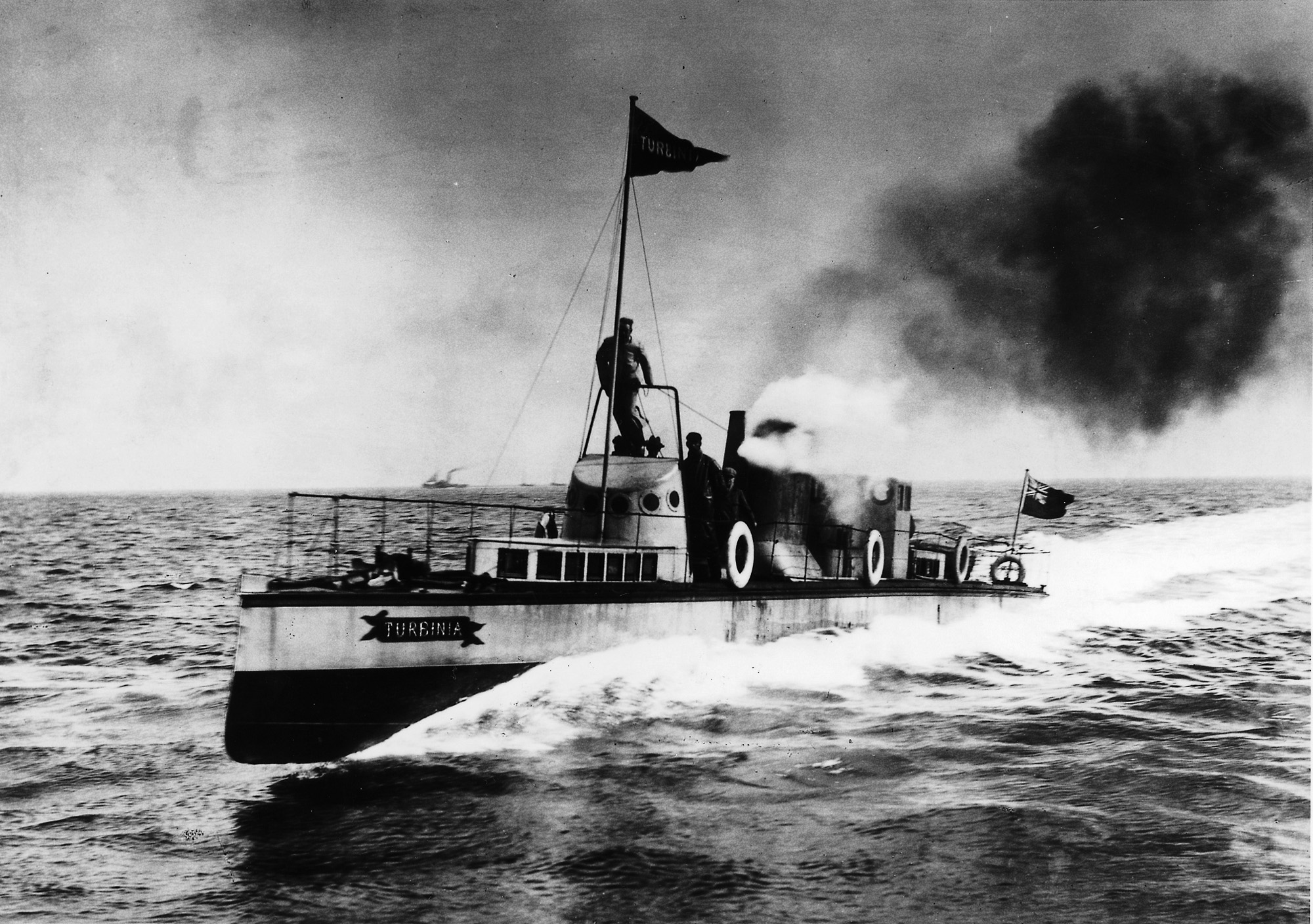
The first steam turbine-powered ship Turbinia: fastest in the world at that time

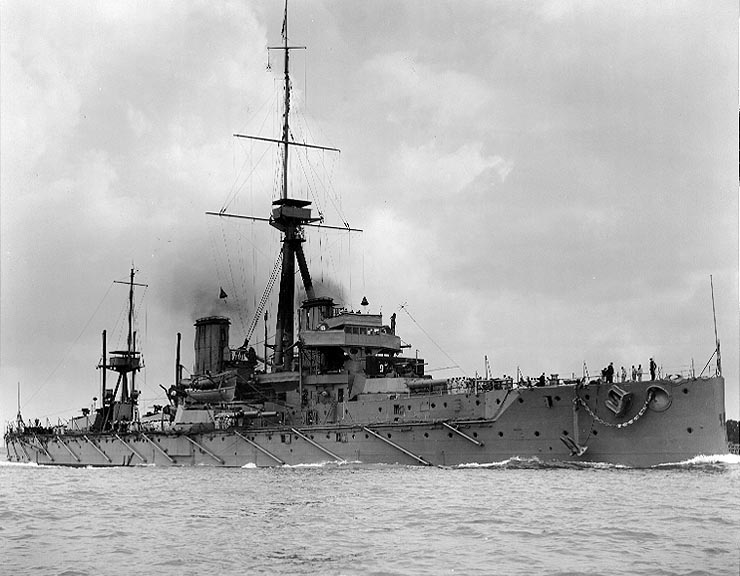
HMS Dreadnought, considered the first modern battleship. In 1906 it was the fastest in the world due to Parsons's steam turbine.

=== Marine steam turbine applications ===
Also interested in marine applications, Parsons founded the Parsons Marine Steam Turbine Company in Newcastle. Famously, in June 1897, his turbine-powered yacht, Turbinia, turned up unannounced at the Fleet review for the Diamond Jubilee of Queen Victoria at Spithead, on 26 June 1897, in front of the Prince of Wales, foreign dignitaries, and Lords of the Admiralty. Moving at speed to demonstrate the great potential of the new technology. The Turbinia moved at 34 kn (63 km/h; 39 mph); the fastest Royal Navy ships using other technologies reached 27 kn (50 km/h; 31 mph). Part of the speed improvement came from the slender hull of the Turbinia.

Within two years the destroyers HMS Viper and Cobra were launched with Parsons's turbines, soon followed by the first turbine-powered passenger ship, Clyde steamer TS King Edward in 1901; the first turbine transatlantic liners RMS Victorian and Virginian in 1905; and the first turbine-powered battleship, HMS Dreadnought in 1906, all of them driven by Parsons' turbine engines. (As of 2026 Turbinia is housed in a purpose-built gallery at the Discovery Museum, Newcastle.)

=== Honours and awards ===
Parsons was elected a Fellow of the Royal Society in June 1898, received their Rumford Medal in 1902, delivered their Bakerian Lecture in 1918, and received their Copley Medal in 1928. Knighted in 1911, he became a member of the Order of Merit in the 1927 Birthday Honours.

Parsons served as the president of the British Association for the Advancement of Science from 1916 to 1919. He was elected an honorary member of the American Society of Mechanical Engineers in 1920.

He was an Invited Speaker of the ICM in 1924 at Toronto. In 1929 the Iron and Steel Institute awarded him the Bessemer Gold Medal.

=== Surviving companies ===
The Parsons turbine company survives in the Heaton area of Newcastle as part of Siemens, a German conglomerate. In 1925 Charles Parsons acquired the Grubb Telescope Company and renamed it Grubb Parsons. That company survived in the Newcastle area until 1985.

Parsons also designed the Auxetophone, an early compressed-air gramophone.

== Personal life and death ==
In 1883, Parsons married Katharine Bethell, the daughter of William F. Bethell. They had two children: the engineer and campaigner Rachel Mary Parsons (b. 1885), and Algernon George "Tommy" Parsons (b. 1886), who was killed in action during World War I in 1918, aged 31.

They had a London home at 1 Upper Brook Street, Mayfair, from 1918 to 1931.

Sir Charles Algernon Parsons died on 11 February 1931, on board the steamship Duchess of Richmond while on a cruise with his wife. The cause of death was given as neuritis. A memorial service was held at Westminster Abbey on 3 March 1931. Parsons was buried in the parish church of St Bartholomew's in Kirkwhelpington in Northumberland.

His widow, Katharine, died at her home in Ray Demesne, Kirkwhelpington, Northumberland in 1933. Rachel Parsons died in 1956; stableman Denis James Pratt was convicted of her manslaughter.

In 1919, Katharine and her daughter Rachel co-founded the Women's Engineering Society with Eleanor Shelley-Rolls, Margaret, Lady Moir, Laura Annie Willson, Margaret Rowbotham and Janetta Mary Ornsby, which is still in existence today. Sir Charles was initially a supportive member of the organisation until his wife's resignation.

== Commemoration ==
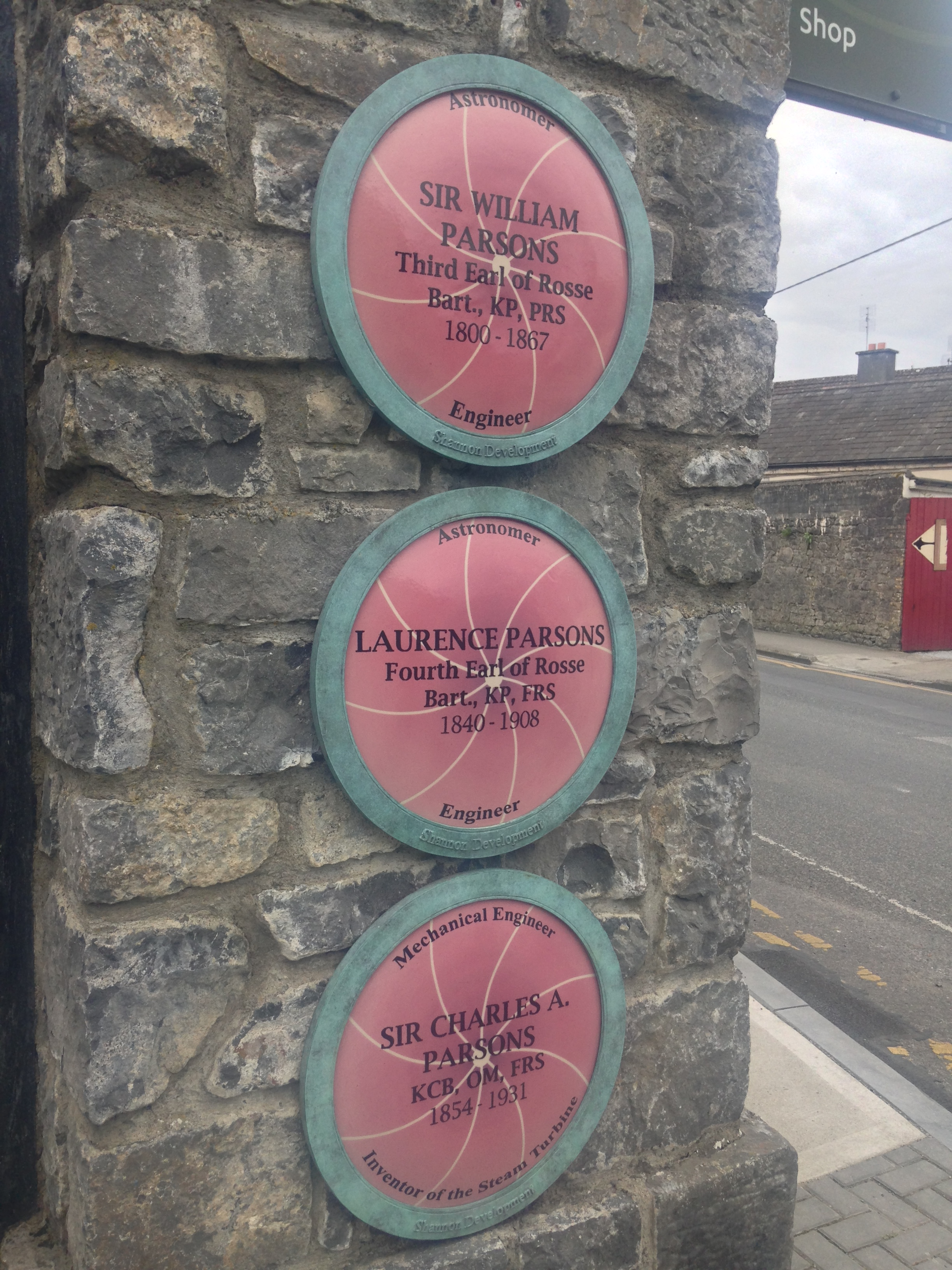
Parsons's plaque in Birr Castle

Parsons's ancestral home at Birr Castle in Ireland houses a museum detailing the contribution the Parsons family have made to the fields of science and engineering, with part of the museum given over to the engineering work of Charles Parsons.

Parsons is depicted on the reverse of an Irish silver 15-Euro silver Proof coin that was struck in 2017.

The Irish Academy of Engineering awards The Parsons Medal, named after Charles Parsons, every year to an engineer who has made an exceptional contribution to the practice of engineering. Previous winners include Prof. Tony Fagan (2016), Dr. Edmond Harty (2017), Prof. Sir John McCanny (2018) and Michael McLaughlin (2019).

== Selected works ==
- E-book: "The Steam Turbine and Other Inventions of Sir Charles Parsons"
- The Steam Turbine (Rede Lecture, 1911)
