= Lawrence Parsons, 4th Earl of Rosse =

Anglo-Irish nobleman

The Right Honourable The Earl of Rosse KP FRS
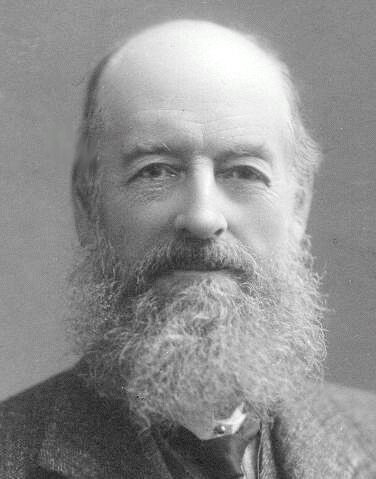

4th Lord Lieutenant of King's County
- In office 1892–1908
- Preceded by: Francis Travers Dames-Longworth
- Succeeded by: The 5th Earl of Rosse

19th Chancellor of the University of Dublin
- In office 1885–1908
- Preceded by: The 1st Earl Cairns
- Succeeded by: The 1st Earl of Iveagh

Personal details
- Born: 17 November 1840 Birr Castle, Parsonstown, King’s County, Ireland (now Birr, County Offaly)
- Died: 29 August 1908 (aged 67)
- Spouse: Frances Cassandra Hawke (m. 1870)
- Children: 3, including William
- Parents: William Parsons, 3rd Earl of Rosse; Mary Rosse
- Relatives: Charles Algernon Parsons (brother)
- Education: Trinity College Dublin; Oxford University
- Awards: FRS (1867); Bakerian Medal (1873); Order of St Patrick (1890)
- Scientific career
- Fields: Astronomy
- Workplaces: Birr Castle

Lawrence Parsons, 4th Earl of Rosse, KP FRS (17 November 1840 – 29 August 1908) was a member of the Irish peerage and an amateur astronomer. His name is often given as Laurence Parsons.

== Biography ==
He was born at Birr Castle, Parsonstown, King's County, Ireland, the son and heir of the astronomer William Parsons, 3rd Earl of Rosse who built the "Leviathan of Parsonstown" telescope, largest of its day, and his wife, the Countess of Rosse (née Mary Field), an amateur astronomer and pioneering photographer. Lawrence succeeded his father in 1867 and was educated first at home by tutors, like John Purser, and after at Trinity College Dublin and Oxford University. He was the brother of Charles Algernon Parsons, inventor of the steam turbine.

He served as Chancellor of the University of Dublin between 1885 and 1908. He was Lord Lieutenant of King's County and Custos Rotulorum of King's County from 1892 to his death. He was also a Justice of the Peace for the county and was appointed High Sheriff of King's County for 1867–68. He was knighted KP in 1890.

Lord Rosse also performed some preliminary work in association with the practices of the electrodeposition of copper sulfate upon silver films circa 1865 whilst in search of the design for a truly flat mirror to use in a telescope. However, he found it impossible to properly electroplate copper upon these silver films, as the copper would contract and detach from the underlying glass substrate. His note has been cited as one of the earliest confirmations in literature that thin films on glass substrates experience residual stresses. He revived discussion on his work in Nature's August 1908 edition after witnessing similar techniques used to present newly devised searchlights before the Royal Society.

Although overshadowed by his father (when astronomers speak of "Lord Rosse", it is almost always the father that they refer to), he nonetheless pursued some astronomical observations of his own, particularly of the Moon. Most notably, he discovered NGC 2. In 1880 Otto Boeddicker, a young astronomer from Germany, became his chief assistant.

He was elected a Fellow of the Royal Society in December 1867 and delivered the Bakerian lecture there in 1873. He was vice-president of the society in 1881 and 1887. From 1896 he was President of the Royal Irish Academy. In May 1902 he was at Carnavon to receive the honorary degree LL.D. (Legum Doctor) from the University of Wales during the ceremony to install the Prince of Wales (later King George V) as Chancellor of that university.

== Marriage and children ==
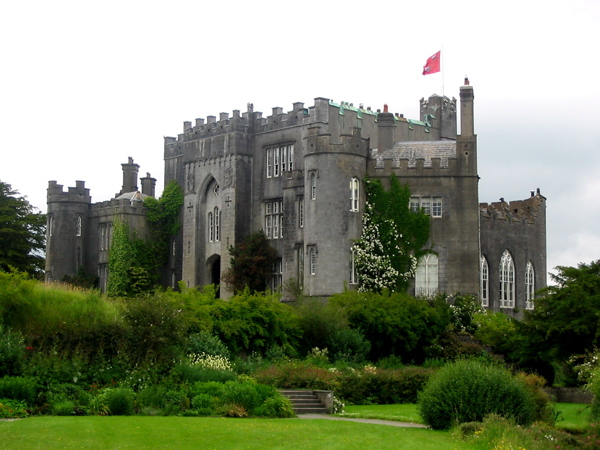
Birr Castle, County Offaly

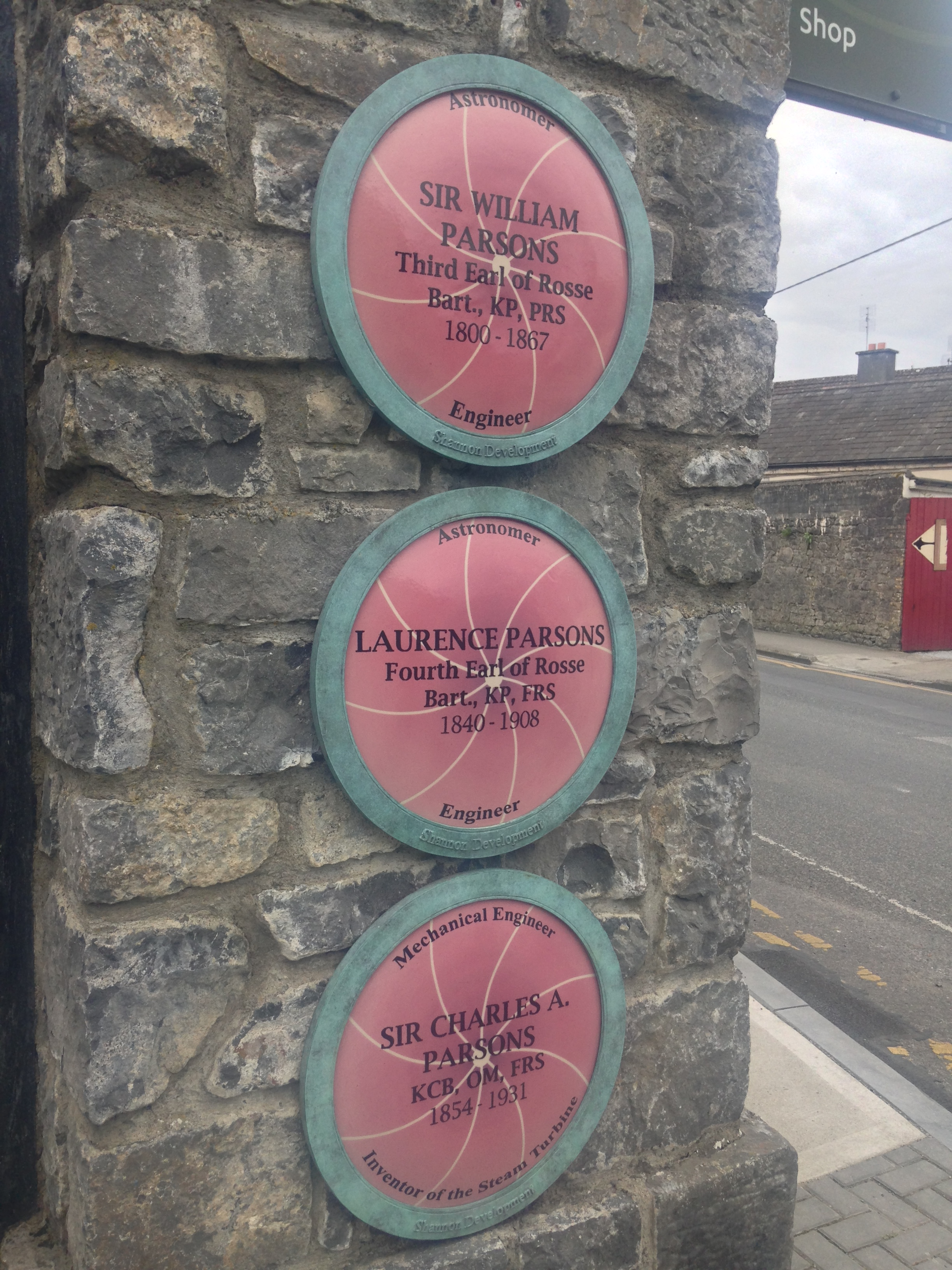
Parsons' plaque in Birr Castle

He married Frances Cassandra Hawke, daughter of Edward Harvey-Hawke, 4th Baron Hawke and Frances Fetherstonhaugh, on 1 September 1870. They had three children:

- William Parsons, 5th Earl of Rosse (14 June 1873 – 10 June 1918), married Frances Lois Lister-Kaye, daughter of Sir Cecil Lister-Kaye, 4th Baronet and Lady Beatrice Adeline Pelham-Clinton
- Hon. Geoffry Lawrence Parsons (24 May 1874 – 13 May 1956), married Margaret Betty Gladstone, daughter of Sir John Gladstone, 4th Baronet
- Lady Muriel Frances Mary Parsons (13 November 1876 – 10 April 1927), married Brigadier-General Harold Maxwell Grenfell, son of Pascoe du Pre Grenfell and Sophia Grenfell

== Sources ==
- "Parsons, Laurence". Oxford Dictionary of National Biography (online ed.). Oxford University Press. doi:10.1093/ref:odnb/35398. (Subscription, Wikipedia Library access or UK public library membership required.)

Honorary titles
Preceded by Francis Travers Dames-Longworth	Lord Lieutenant of King's County; 1892–1908	Succeeded by The Earl of Rosse
Political offices
Preceded by The Lord Farnham	Representative peer for Ireland; 1868–1908	Succeeded by The Lord Ashtown
Academic offices
Preceded by The Earl Cairns	Chancellor of the University of Dublin; 1885–1908	Succeeded by The Earl of Iveagh
Peerage of Ireland
Preceded by William Parsons	Earl of Rosse; 1867–1908	Succeeded by William Edward Parsons
