= Custos Rotulorum of King's County =

The Custos Rotulorum of King's County was the highest civil officer in King's County, Ireland (now County Offaly). The position was later combined with that of Lord Lieutenant of King's County.

== Incumbents ==
- 1687–? Robert Grace
- 1761–1764 Charles Moore, 1st Earl of Charleville
- 1766–1822 Charles Moore, 6th Earl of Drogheda
- 1828–1841 Lawrence Parsons, 2nd Earl of Rosse

For later custodes rotulorum, see Lord Lieutenant of King's County
