= Edward Beaumont-Nesbitt =

Anglo-Irish landowner and official (born 1860)

Edward John Downing Beaumont-Nesbitt OBE DL (1859 – 1 January 1944) was an Anglo-Irish landowner and official.

== Biography ==
Beaumont-Nesbitt was the son of Rev. Thomas George Beaumont and Tamazine Bradshaw. Beaumont-Nesbitt was High Sheriff of King's County in 1892 and served as the final Lord Lieutenant of King's County between 1918 and 1922, when the position was abolished. He was a Deputy Lieutenant and Justice of the Peace for King's County. He was appointed an Officer of the Order of the British Empire in 1919.

He inherited Tubberdaly House and estate from his aunt, Catherine Nesbitt, in 1886 at which point he assumed the additional surname of Nesbitt. He married Helen Thomas on 30 April 1890; together they had four children including Frederick Beaumont-Nesbitt. In 1920 Beaumont-Nesbitt left Ireland following a series of disputes with his staff, including a strike which lasted for three months. On 15 April 1923 his house at Tubberdaly was burned down by the Irish Republican Army. In 1925, the Irish Land Commission took over the estate and paid compensation to Beaumont-Nesbitt for his loss; the land was subsequently divided among local residents. His land in County Antrim and County Londonderry was sold in 1930.

Honorary titles
Preceded by The Earl of Rosse	Lord Lieutenant of King's County; 1918–1922	Position abolished
