= Thomas Bernard (1816–1882) =

Anglo-Irish British Army officer and landowner (1816–1882)

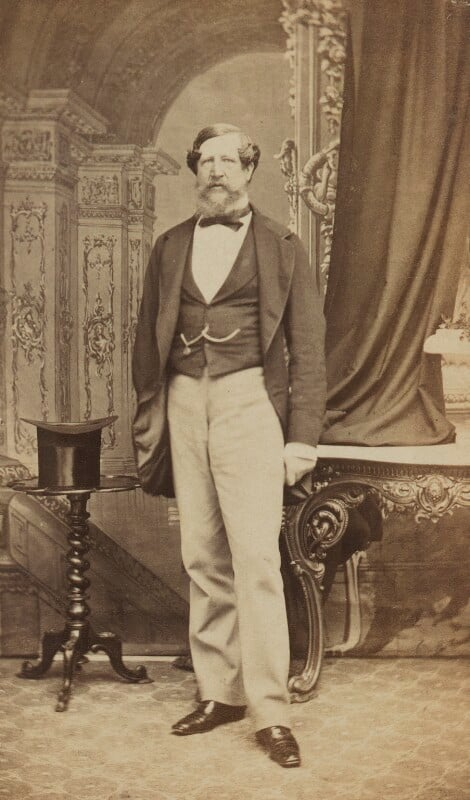
Bernard in the early 1860s

Colonel Thomas Bernard (September 1816 – 13 December 1882) was an Anglo-Irish British Army officer and official.

== Biography ==
Bernard was the son of Thomas Bernard and Lady Catherine Henrietta Hely-Hutchinson. He was commissioned into the 12th Royal Lancers, attaining the rank of Captain before retiring on half-pay. He served as High Sheriff of King's County in 1837. Bernard was appointed Lord Lieutenant of King's County on 17 December 1867, serving in the role until his death. He was appointed Lieutenant-Colonel of the King's County Royal Rifle Militia on 6 March 1855, just before it was embodied for home defence duties during the Crimean War. He retained the command until 1871 and afterwards became the regiment's Honorary Colonel. Bernard was the owner of Castle Bernard, County Offaly.

He had an illegitimate daughter with actress Sarah Fairbrother. The daughter, Louisa Catherine, was born on 22 March 1839, and baptised as if she were legitimate, with the surname Bernard (although her birth was not registered under either Bernard or Fairbrother). Bernard made provision for her at the time of her marriage. Louisa Catherine died without issue in 1919.

Honorary titles
Preceded by The Earl of Rosse	Lord Lieutenant of King's County; 1867–1882	Succeeded by Francis Travers Dames-Longworth
