= William Parsons, 5th Earl of Rosse =

Irish nobleman

William Edward Parsons, 5th Earl of Rosse (14 June 1873 – 10 June 1918) was an Irish peer and British Army officer. He was known as Lord Oxmantown until 1908.

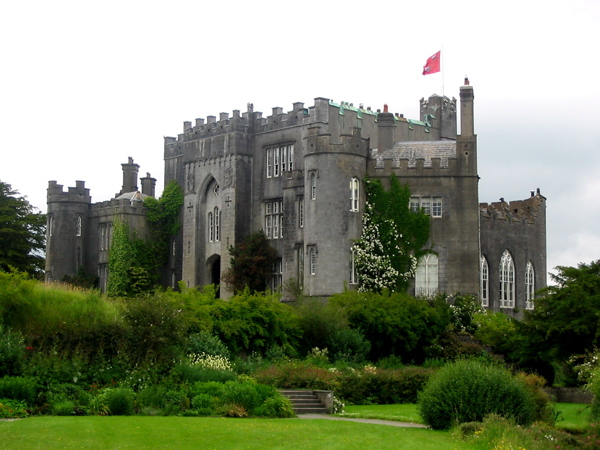
Birr Castle, County Offaly

== Early life ==
He was the son of Lawrence Parsons, 4th Earl of Rosse and Frances Cassandra Hawke. Lord Rosse was educated at Eton College and Christ Church, Oxford. He subsequently studied farming in Denmark.

Lord Oxmantown was commissioned into a militia battalion of the West Yorkshire Regiment in 1896 and promoted lieutenant shortly afterwards. He was commissioned as a regular officer in the Coldstream Guards in 1897, but transferred to the Irish Guards on its formation in 1900. He was promoted captain in 1900 and major in 1906.

== Inheritance and later life ==
He resigned his commission in 1908 on inheriting his peerage and served as Lord Lieutenant of King's County from 1908 to his death. He was elected as an Irish representative peer in 1911.

He returned to military service in the First World War, serving as a Major with the Irish Guards. He was Second-in-Command of his Battalion at Festubert on 10 May 1915 when he was very severely wounded in the head by a piece of shell. He was returned home to Birr Castle, County Offaly, where he died on 10 June 1918 at the age of 44. He is buried in the family vault at the Birr Old Graveyard.

In February 1919 contemporary newspapers reported that the value of Lord Rosse's personal estate in England and Ireland was £18,322, and that Estate Duties of 13% were levied on the whole of his estate (including entailed property), indicating that the total value of Rosse's estates was between £250,000 and £300,000.

== Marriage and children ==
Lord Rosse married Frances Lois Lister-Kaye (1882–1984), daughter of Sir Cecil Lister-Kaye, 4th Baronet and Lady Beatrice Adeline Pelham-Clinton, on 19 October 1905.

They had three children:

- Lawrence Michael Harvey Parsons, 6th Earl of Rosse (b. 28 September 1906, d. c 1979), married Anne Messel, daughter of Lt.-Col. Leonard Charles Rudolph Messel (later mother-in-law of Princess Margaret), and had issue.
- Lady Mary Bridget Parsons (27 October 1907 - 26 January 1972)
- Hon. Desmond Edward Parsons (b. 13 December 1910, d. 4 July 1937)

His widow remarried, to Ivo Richard Vesey, 5th Viscount de Vesci, on 15 May 1920.

Honorary titles
Preceded by The Earl of Rosse	Lord Lieutenant of King's County; 1909–1918	Succeeded by Edward Beaumont-Nesbitt
Peerage of Ireland
Preceded by Lawrence Parsons	Earl of Rosse; 1908–1918	Succeeded by Lawrence Parsons
Political offices
Preceded by The Lord Bellew	Representative peer for Ireland; 1911–1918	Succeeded by The Viscount Charlemont
