= Lord Lieutenant of King's County =

Ceremonial officer in King's County, Ireland

This is a list of those who have served as Lord Lieutenant of King's County.

There were lieutenants of counties in Ireland until the reign of James II, when they were renamed governors. The office of Lord Lieutenant was recreated on 23 August 1831.

== Governors ==
- Charles Moore, 6th Earl of Drogheda, 1752–1784; again in 1805
- Lawrence Parsons, 2nd Earl of Rosse, 1792–1831
- Henry Peisley L'Estrange –1831
- Thomas Bernard, 1828–1831

== Lord Lieutenants ==
- William Parsons, 3rd Earl of Rosse, 7 October 1831 – 31 October 1867
- Thomas Bernard, 17 December 1867 – 13 December 1882
- Francis Travers Dames-Longworth, 20 March 1883 – 1892
- Lawrence Parsons, 4th Earl of Rosse, 13 June 1892 – 29 August 1908
- William Parsons, 5th Earl of Rosse, 5 February 1909 – 10 June 1918
- Edward Beaumont-Nesbitt, 3 September 1918 – 1922
