= Francis Travers Dames-Longworth =

Anglo-Irish lawyer (1834–1898)

Francis Travers Dames-Longworth QC (26 April 1834 – 3 December 1898) was an Anglo-Irish lawyer.

== Biography ==
Dames-Longworth was the son of Francis Longworth-Dames and Anna Hume. He was educated at Cheltenham College and Trinity College Dublin, and called to the Irish Bar in 1855. He inherited Glynwood House and its estate in 1881, and rebuilt the house with the assistance of architect George Moyers.

In 1872, Dames-Longworth was made a Queen's Counsel, and he was elected Bencher of the King's Inns in 1876. He was on the Commission of the Peace for six Irish counties. In 1882 he was appointed High Sheriff of Westmeath and he served as Lord Lieutenant of King's County between 1883 and 1892. He served a year as High Sheriff of County Galway in 1890. Dames-Longworth was then made Lord Lieutenant of Westmeath from 1892 until his death in 1898.

Honorary titles
| Preceded by Thomas Bernard | Lord Lieutenant of King's County; 1883–1892 | Succeeded by The Earl of Rosse |
| Preceded by The Lord Castlemaine | Lord Lieutenant of Westmeath; 1892–1898 | Succeeded by The Lord Castlemaine |
