= Leviathan of Parsonstown =

Historic Irish reflecting telescope

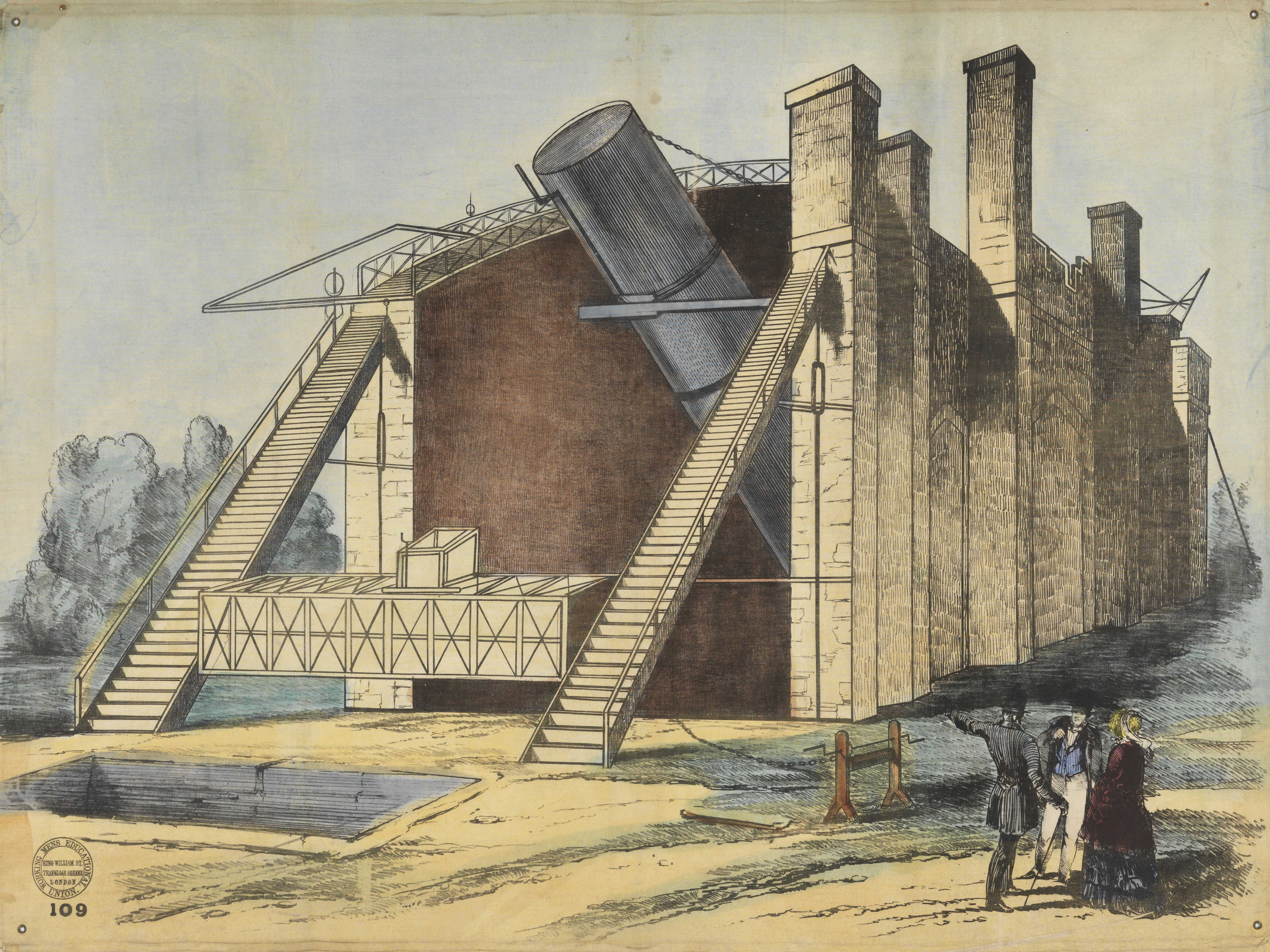
- Victorian picture of the "Leviathan of Parsonstown"
- Alternative names: Great Rosse
- Location(s): Birr Castle, Birr, County Offaly, Leinster, Ireland
- Coordinates: 53°05′48″N 7°55′03″W
- Diameter: 72 inches (183 cm)
- Focal length: 16 m (52 ft 6 in)
- Website: birrcastle.com/telescope-astronomy/
- Location of Leviathan of Parsonstown
- Related media on Commons

The Leviathan of Parsonstown, or Rosse six-foot telescope, is a historic reflecting telescope of 72 inches (1.83 m) aperture, which was the largest telescope in the world from 1845 until the construction of the 100-inch (2.5 m) Hooker Telescope in California in 1917. The Rosse six-foot telescope was built by William Parsons, 3rd Earl of Rosse on his estate, Birr Castle, at Parsonstown (now Birr) in Ireland.

== Design and construction ==
Parsons improved the techniques of casting, grinding and polishing large telescope mirrors from speculum metal, and constructed steam-powered grinding machines for parabolic mirrors. His 3 foot (91 cm) mirror of 1839 was cast in smaller pieces and then fitted together before grinding and polishing; its 1840 successor was cast in a single piece. In 1842, Parsons cast his first 6 foot (1.83 m) mirror, but it took another five casts before he had two ground and polished mirrors. Speculum mirrors tarnished rapidly; with two mirrors, one could be used in the telescope while the other was being re-polished. The telescope tube and supporting structure were completed in 1845.

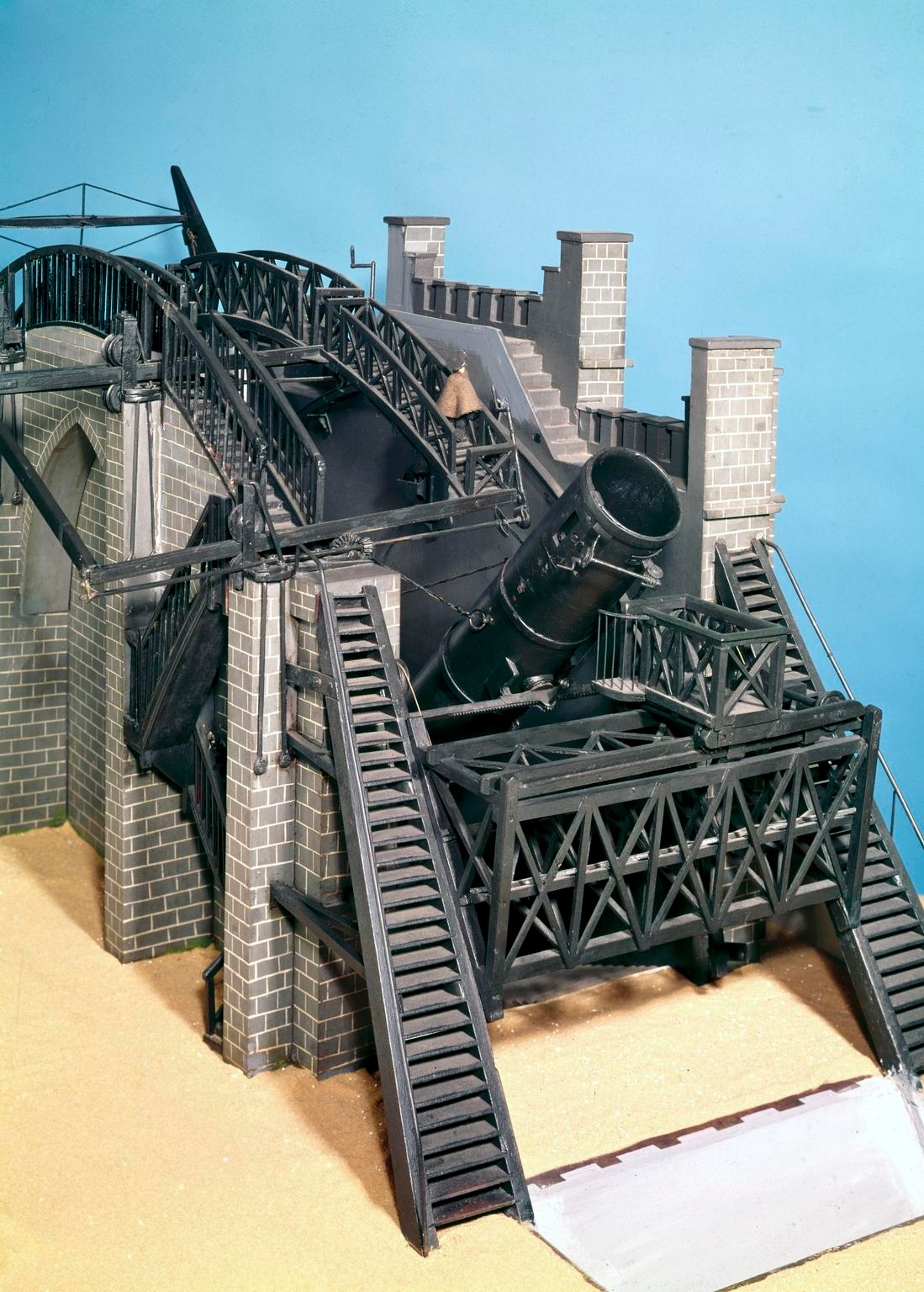
A 1:24 model of the telescope made by Parsons in 1844–45.

The mirror was 5 inches (13 cm) thick and weighed almost 3 tons. This required a mirror cell to support and to prevent the mirror deforming under its own weight. The length of the tube and mirror box is about 54 feet (16.5 m); including the mirror it weighed about 12 tons. The tube is supported at the mirror end by a "universal joint", a hinge with two axes, which allows the tube to be inclined through a large range of altitude and also to be turned through a limited range of azimuth. The azimuth range is limited to about one hour by the supporting walls that flank the tube on its eastern and western sides. The walls are 23 feet (7.0 m) apart, 40 feet (12 m) high, and 71 feet (21.6 m) long. A chain and counterweight keeps the telescope in balance, another chain with a winch controls the altitude. A rack and pinion beam underneath the tube controls the azimuth. This beam is connected to the eastern supporting wall, where it can move on a circular iron arc to allow the telescope to change altitude.

The tube is of the Newtonian design with the eyepiece on its western side. At low altitude, the observer accesses the eyepiece from a wooden gallery that spans the distance between the walls and can slide up and down guides to follow the telescope in altitude. A cage on the gallery moves sideways to reach the eyepiece at different azimuth. At high elevation, curved galleries on top of the western wall are used, which can be moved across the wall to follow the telescope in azimuth.

== Operation ==
The purpose of the telescope was to re-visit the nebulae in the catalogues of Charles Messier and John Herschel. These catalogues list star clusters as well as nebulae, and the question was whether the latter were merely unresolved star clusters or genuinely nebulous regions of space. If resolved into stars they might be the first galaxies to be identified as such. Parsons discovered that several nebulae had a spiral structure, suggesting "dynamical laws". The most notable spiral nebula observed by Parsons was Messier 51, which he resolved into stars.

After William Parsons (the 3rd Earl of Rosse) died in 1867, the 4th Earl (Laurence Parsons) continued to operate the six-foot telescope. From 1874 to 1878, J. L. E. Dreyer worked with the telescope and began the compilation of his New General Catalogue of Nebulae and Clusters of Stars.

Although the 4th Earl built a smaller 3 ft equatorial in 1876, the six-foot telescope remained in use until about 1890. After his death in 1908, the telescope was partly dismantled, and in 1914, one of the mirrors with its mirror box was transferred to the Science Museum in London. The walls remained. The tube, second mirror box, and universal joint survived.

== Restoration ==
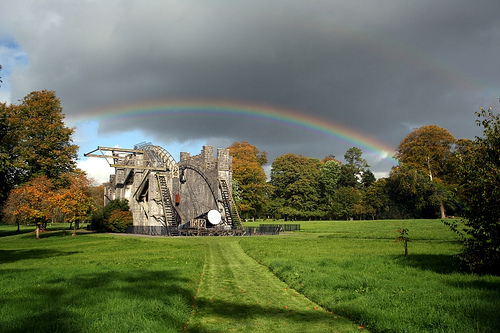
Reconstructed telescope seen from a distance

Following a TV programme, lecture, and book by Patrick Moore, there was renewed interest in the six-foot telescope in the 1970s. Gradually, the telescope became a visitor attraction. But it was not until the 1990s that plans to actually rebuild the telescope came to fruition. In 1994 the retired structural engineer and amateur astronomer Michael Tubridy was called in to research and re-design the Rosse six-foot telescope. The original plans were lost, and so it took detective work to review the remains of the telescope, incidental comments in observing logs, and contemporary photographs taken by Mary Rosse, wife of the 3rd Earl. Reconstruction work lasted from early 1996 to early 1997. It had been planned to include a working mirror, but due to budget constraints this had to be left for a separate project.

The new mirror was installed in 1999. Unlike the speculum original, and unlike modern aluminium- or silver-coated glass mirrors, this is made of aluminium, as a compromise between authenticity and utility in astronomical observation.

== LOFAR station ==
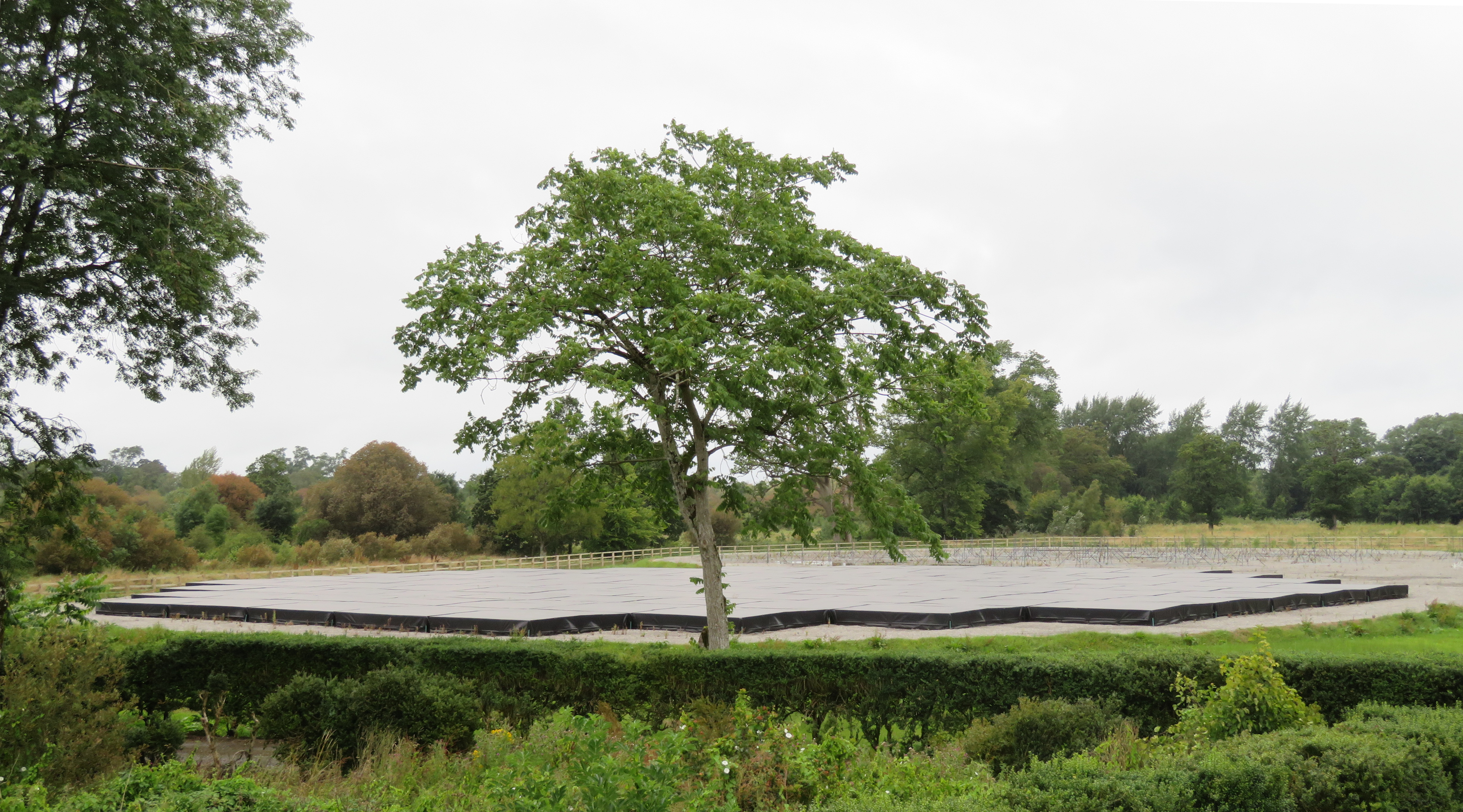
The Irish low-frequency array (I-LOFAR) radio telescope in the castle grounds.

In 2017, LOFAR radio-telescope station IE613, one of some 50 similar stations in Europe, was constructed in the grounds of the castle. This is the westernmost station in the LOFAR network, which stretches as far east as Latvia. LOFAR makes observations in the 10 MHz to 240 MHz frequency range with two types of antennas: Low Band Antenna (LBA) and High Band Antenna (HBA), optimized for 10–80 MHz and 120–240 MHz respectively. The Birr Castle station consists of 96 LBAs and 96 HBAs and a total of 96 digital Receiver Units (RCUs).

The Birr Castle station on its own is the Irish Low Frequency Array (I-LOFAR) telescope. In 2018, I-LOFAR observed for the first time a billion-year-old red-dwarf, flare star, namely CN Leo (Wolf 359), 7.9 light years away.

== Pictures ==
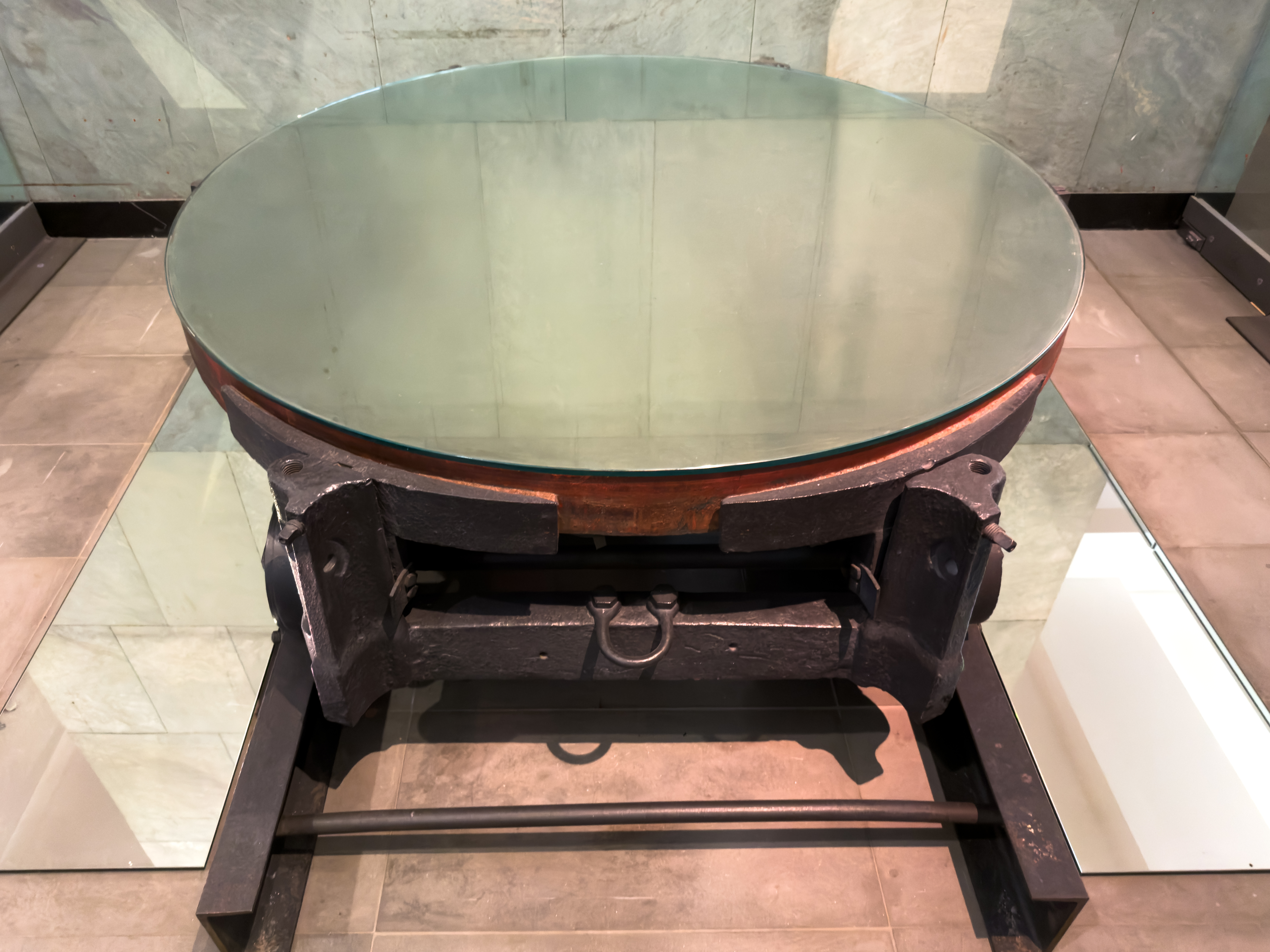
One of the two original mirrors, now at the Science Museum, London

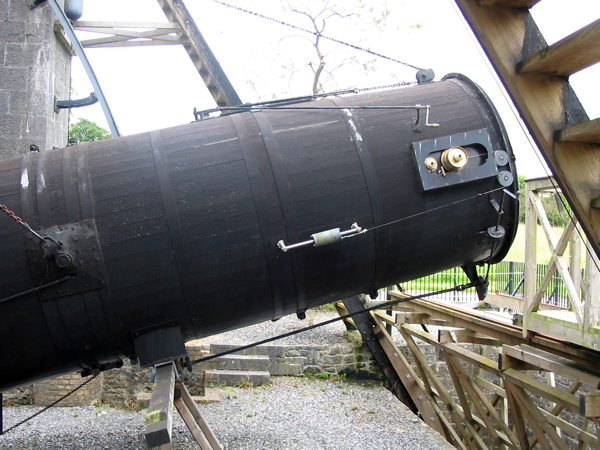
The reconstructed telescope

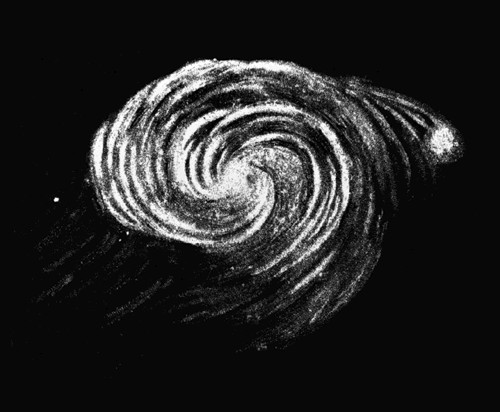
Drawing of M51, later known as the Whirlpool Galaxy by 3rd Earl of Rosse in 1845 based on observations using the Leviathan

== See also ==
- List of largest optical telescopes historically
- Craig telescope (refracting telescope of the 1850s)
- List of largest optical telescopes in the British Isles
- List of largest optical telescopes of the 19th century
- Lists of telescopes
