= Frederick Beaumont-Nesbitt =

British Army general (1893–1971)

Major-General Frederick Beaumont-Nesbitt CVO CBE MC
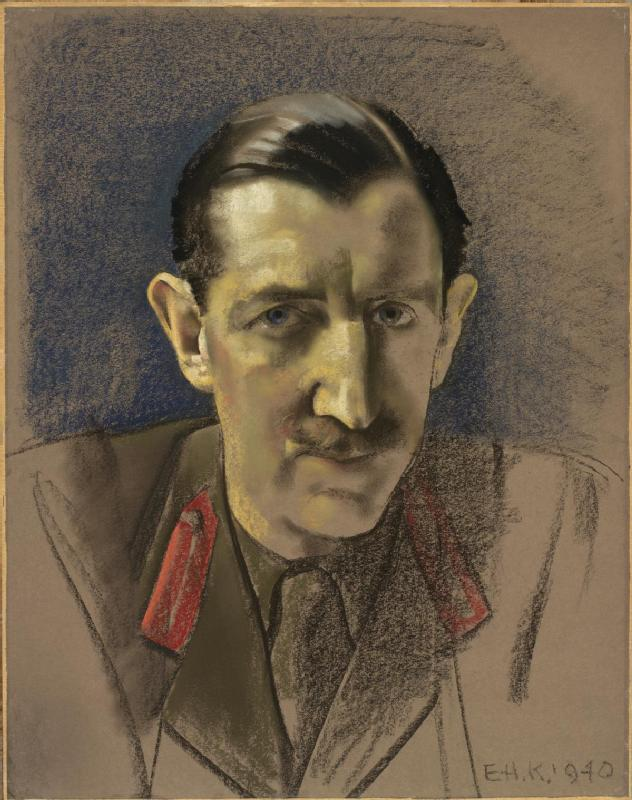
- Sketch of Beaumont-Nesbitt in 1940
- Born: 26 March 1893; Dublin, County Dublin, Ireland
- Died: 14 December 1971 (aged 78); St Pancras, London, England
- Military career
- Allegiance: United Kingdom
- Branch: British Army
- Service years: 1912–1945
- Rank: Major-General
- Service number: 1138
- Unit: Grenadier Guards
- Commands: Director of Military Intelligence (1939–40); 2nd Battalion, Grenadier Guards (1932–35)
- Conflicts: First World War; Second World War
- Awards: Commander of the Royal Victorian Order; Commander of the Order of the British Empire; Military Cross; Mentioned in Despatches

Major-General Frederick George Beaumont-Nesbitt, CVO, CBE, MC (26 March 1893 – 14 December 1971) was a senior British Army officer. He served as a captain in the First World War, and was Director of Military Intelligence from the start of the Second World War until December 1940.

== Military career ==
Beaumont-Nesbitt was the son of Edward Beaumont-Nesbitt and Helen Thomas. He was educated at Eton College and the Royal Military College, Sandhurst, and was commissioned into the Grenadier Guards in 1912. He was promoted from second lieutenant to lieutenant on 5 August 1914, and to captain in 1915, then serving as adjutant at the Divisional Base Depot.

From 3 November 1915 until 16 August 1916 he served as aide-de-camp to Lieutenant-General Richard Haking, then in command of the 11th Army Corps, finally returning to his regiment on 16 September 1916. On 8 May 1917 he was seconded to the staff as a General Staff Officer, Grade 3, serving with the 4th Army. On 24 March 1918 he was appointed brigade major of the 3rd Guards Brigade.

From February 1919 he served as the adjutant of a Dispersal Unit (overseeing the demobilization of conscripts), until on 29 May 1919 he was appointed a Staff Captain in the 2nd Guards Brigade. In December 1919 Beaumont-Nesbitt was awarded the Military Cross.

He spent a year as an instructor in English at a French military school, before returning to his regiment in August 1921 to serve as adjutant until August 1922. In November 1922 Beaumont-Nesbitt was attached to the War Office as a General Staff Officer, 3rd Grade, and was promoted to the rank of major on 2 February 1924. On 6 June 1924 he left the staff only to return on 1 September 1926, as a General Staff Officer, 2nd Grade, and served there until 1 September 1930.

He was promoted to the rank of lieutenant colonel on 22 May 1932, and commanded the 2nd Battalion, Grenadier Guards, until 1935. On 1 February 1936 he was appointed military attaché in Paris (as a General Staff Officer, 1st Grade, or GSO1, on half-pay) with the brevet rank of colonel. He was promoted to colonel on 22 May 1936, with seniority backdated to 1 February. He was later made a Commander of the Royal Victorian Order. He then attended the Imperial Defence College, where Richard O'Connor was a fellow student.

On 29 August 1938 Beaumont-Nesbitt was appointed the Deputy Director of Military Intelligence at the War Office, and granted the temporary rank of brigadier. On the day following the declaration of war, 4 September 1939, he was made an acting major-general, and took over as Director of Military Intelligence after the former incumbent Henry Pownall was appointed Chief of Staff of the British Expeditionary Force. On 4 September 1940 he received the temporary rank of major-general. Beaumont-Nesbitt relinquished the position of DMI on 16 December 1940.

On 15 January 1941 Beaumont-Nesbitt was re-granted the temporary rank of major general, to serve as a military attaché, and from 15 June 1941 as a member of the British Army Staff, in Washington DC. Between 1943 and 1945 he was on active service in the Middle East, North Africa and Italy, receiving a mention in despatches on 6 April 1944 for "gallant and distinguished services in the Middle East" and also being made a Commander of the Order of the British Empire. In 1944 he was appointed an aide-de-camp to King George VI serving until September 1945. He ended the war as a liaison officer on the staff of Field Marshal Harold Alexander, Supreme Allied Commander Mediterranean.

Beaumont-Nesbitt left the Army in late 1945, but remained in the Reserve of Officers until reaching the mandatory retirement age of 60 on 24 March 1953. He was appointed a Gentleman Usher to the Queen in November 1959, and serving until April 1967.

Major-General Beaumont-Nesbitt died on 14 December 1971.

== Personal life ==
In 1915 he married Cecilia Mary Lavinia Bingham (1893–1920), the daughter of Major-General the Honourable Sir Cecil Edward Bingham. They had two children; David Frederick John Beaumont-Nesbitt, (1916–1972) and Audrey Helen Anne Beaumont-Nesbitt, (1919–2009). In 1928 he married the Honourable Ruby Hardinge (1897–1977), the daughter of Henry Charles Hardinge, 3rd Viscount Hardinge, and they had three further children; June Rose Beaumont-Nesbitt (1929–), Dermot Beaumont-Nesbitt, (1931–2016), and Brian Beaumont-Nesbitt, (1932–).

== Bibliography ==
- Smart, Nick (2005). Biographical Dictionary of British Generals of the Second World War. Barnsley: Pen and Sword Books. ISBN 1844150496.

Military offices
Preceded by Henry Pownall (As Director of Military Operations and Intelligence)	Director of Military Intelligence; 1939–1940	Succeeded by Francis Davidson
