= Bridget Parsons =

English socialite (1907–1972)

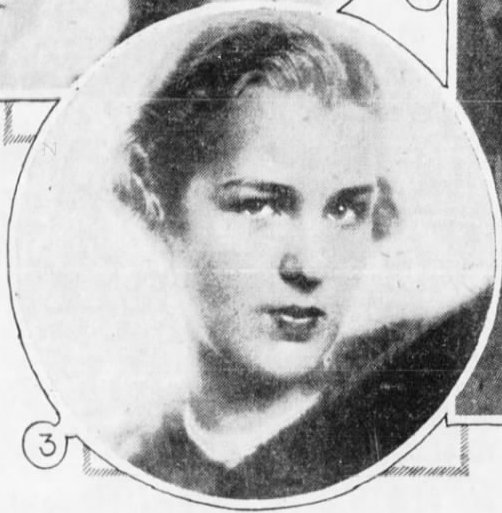
Lady Mary Bridget Parsons

Lady Mary Bridget Parsons (27 October 1907 – 26 January 1972) was an English socialite, part of the Bright Young Things.

== Biography ==
Lady Mary Bridget Parsons was born on 27 October 1907, the daughter of William Parsons, 5th Earl of Rosse and Frances Lois Lister-Kaye, Viscountess de Vesci of Abbey Leix.

In the 1920s she was part of the wild crowd known as the Bright Young Things. Jeremy Hutchinson defended her on a drink driving charge (Deborah Mitford and her husband, Andrew Cavendish, 11th Duke of Devonshire were passengers). A police officer standing guard outside the German Embassy arrested her and locked her in the embassy building, but she was seen to sway as she got into the taxi that had been called. Hutchinson persuaded the court that Parsons' uncertainty on her feet was caused by her high heels and tight evening dress. Photographs following the verdict show her being led out of court by John Betjeman, who apparently said to her "A wonderful show! This way, Bridget, old girl!". She has been credited with her brother Michael to have introduced the Charleston in Mayfair ballrooms.

For a time in the 1930s, she had an affair with Sacheverell Sitwell. She was friend with Clarissa Eden, who said "I have never had women friends with whom I exchanged confidences, except perhaps now in old age and retrospectively. My friendship with Bridget was based on her being exceptionally intelligent and knowledgeable and, being older, more sophisticated. She was also extremely beautiful and had been loved by many, but either through fastidiousness or lack of passion seemed never to have responded." Daphne Fielding wrote in her memoirs that Bridget Parsons had an affair with Prince George, Duke of Kent.

James Lees-Milne, who, at school loved two boys, Tom Mitford and Desmond Parsons (both died very young), afterwards became infatuated with their sisters who reminded him of them, Diana Mitford and Bridget Parsons.

In November 1935 a portrait of Lady Mary Bridget Parsons by Cecil Beaton appeared on Vogue. She was Beaton's friend, and frequented his house, Ashcombe, together with Diana Cavendish, Tony Herbert, Tilly Losch, Teresa Jungman, Elizabeth Smith, Lady Caroline Paget, David Herbert. Other friends included: Randolph Churchill and Tanis Guinness.

She was friends with Cynthia Gladwyn, who wrote in her diaries: "It is curious to look back on those nights when Bridget Parsons and I used to sit on the staircase, wrapped in rugs, trying to talk about trivialities while the great thunder of the Blitzes raged and the whole building shook and the lights dipped. One didn't know for sure which crashes were our guns and which were bombs. Then at last the All Clear would sound and we'd go back to our beds."

She lived at Womersley Park, Womersley, West Yorkshire, England. She was on the board of the Zoological Society. She was friends with Patrick Leigh Fermor, who visited often Birr Castle, her family castle.

She died unmarried on 26 January 1972 and is buried at St. Martin's Churchyard, Womersley, with her mother, Frances Lois Lister-Kaye, Viscountess de Vesci of Abbey Leix.
