= Lawrence Parsons, 2nd Earl of Rosse =

Irish peer

The Earl of Rosse
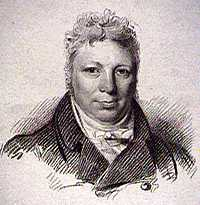
- 2nd Earl of Rosse
- Born: 21 May 1758
- Died: 24 February 1841 (aged 82)
- Occupation: Irish peer
- Spouse: Alice Lloyd
- Children: five
- Parent(s): Sir William Parsons, 4th Baronet and Mary Clere

Lawrence Parsons, 2nd Earl of Rosse (21 May 1758 – 24 February 1841), known as Sir Lawrence Parsons, Bt, from 1791 to 1807, was an Irish peer.

== Biography ==
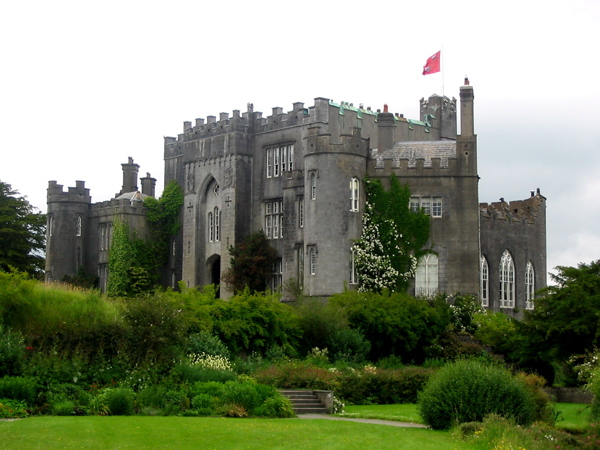
Birr Castle, County Offaly

Parsons was the son of Sir William Parsons, 4th Baronet and Mary Clere. He succeeded his father in 1791 to the baronetcy and to Birr Castle, King's County (now known as County Offaly).

Between 1782 and 1790, he represented Dublin University in the Irish House of Commons. Parsons sat then as Member of Parliament (MP) for King's County from 1791 until the Act of Union in 1801. In the following co-option, he chose to sit for King's County also in the British House of Commons, a seat he held until 1807. In the latter year, he succeeded his uncle as second Earl of Rosse and Lord Oxmantown.

He also served as Governor of King's County from 1792 until the position was abolished in 1831.

In 1793 the Parsonstown Loyal Independent Volunteers raised by his family in 1776 as part of the Irish Volunteers was taken onto the official Irish Militia establishment as the King's County Royal Rifle Militia, and he served as the regiment's Colonel until 1798.

In 1809, he became one of the Postmasters General of Ireland with Charles O'Neill, 1st Earl O'Neill, with whom he attended the laying of the foundation stone for the new General Post Office in Dublin on 12 August 1814 by the Lord Lieutenant of Ireland, Charles Whitworth, 1st Earl Whitworth. He later sat in the House of Lords as an Irish representative peer from 1809 until 1841 and served as Custos Rotulorum of King's County from 1828 until his death.

=== Marriage and children ===
He married Alice Lloyd of nearby Gloster House, daughter of John Lloyd, on 1 May 1797. They had five children:

- Lady Jane Parsons (d. 31 December 1883)
- William Parsons, 3rd Earl of Rosse (b. 17 June 1800 – d. 31 October 1867)
- Hon. John Clere Parsons (b. 17 August 1802 – d. 10 August 1828)
- Hon. Laurence Parsons (b. 2 November 1805 – d. 22 November 1894)
- Lady Alicia Parsons (b. c. 1815 – d. 21 January 1885)

Jane Parsons married Arthur Edward Knox. They had two sons and three daughters. One of the sons, Lawrence E. Knox founded the Irish Times.

== References and sources ==
Notes

Sources

- Lundy, Darryl. "p. 1279 § 12789". The Peerage.
- Kidd, Charles, Williamson, David (editors). Debrett's Peerage and Baronetage (1990 edition). New York: St Martin's Press, 1990,
- Leigh Rayment's Peerage Pages
- Leigh Rayment's Historical List of MPs

Parliament of Ireland
Preceded by Walter Hussey-Burgh; John FitzGibbon	Member of Parliament for Dublin University; 1782–1790; With: John FitzGibbon 1782–1783; Arthur Browne 1783–1790	Succeeded by Hon. Francis Hely-Hutchinson; Arthur Browne
Preceded by Sir William Parsons, 4th Bt; Denis Bowes Daly	Member of Parliament for King's County; 1791–1801; With: Denis Bowes Daly	Succeeded by Parliament of the United Kingdom
Parliament of the United Kingdom
Preceded by Parliament of Ireland	Member of Parliament for King's County; 1801–1807; With: Denis Bowes Daly 1801–1802; Thomas Bernard 1802–1807	Succeeded by Thomas Bernard; Hardress Lloyd
Political offices
Preceded by The Earl of Normanton	Representative peer for Ireland; 1809–1841	Succeeded by The Earl of Caledon
Peerage of Ireland
Preceded by Lawrence Parsons	Earl of Rosse; 1807–1841	Succeeded by Lawrence Parsons
Baronetage of Ireland
Preceded by Lawrence Parsons	Baronet (of Birr Castle); 1791–1841	Succeeded by Lawrence Parsons
