= William Parsons, 3rd Earl of Rosse =

English engineer and astronomer (1800–1867)

The Right Honourable The Earl of Rosse KP FRS
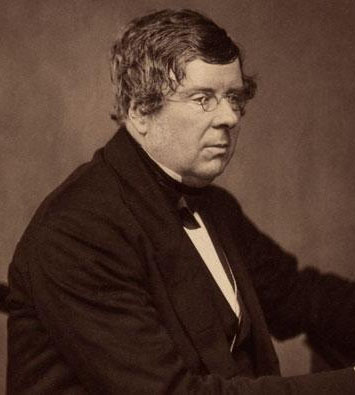

27th President of the Royal Society
- In office 1848–1854
- Preceded by: Spencer Compton
- Succeeded by: John Wrottesley

Personal details
- Born: 17 June 1800 York, England
- Died: 31 October 1867 (aged 67) Monkstown, Dublin, Ireland
- Education: Trinity College Dublin; Magdalen College, Oxford
- Notable work: Leviathan of Parsonstown
- Spouse: Mary Field (m. 1836)
- Children: 13, including Lawrence and Charles
- Parent(s): Lawrence Parsons, 2nd Earl of Rosse; Alice Lloyd
- Awards: FRS (1831); Order of St Patrick (1845); Royal Medal (1851)
- Scientific career
- Fields: Astronomy
- Workplaces: Birr Castle

William Parsons, 3rd Earl of Rosse, KP, FRS (17 June 1800 – 31 October 1867) was an English engineer and astronomer. He built several giant telescopes. His 72-inch telescope, built in 1845 and colloquially known as the "Leviathan of Parsonstown", was the world's largest telescope, in terms of aperture size, until the early 20th century. From April 1807 until February 1841, he was styled as Baron Oxmantown.

== Life ==
He was born in York, England, the son of Sir Lawrence Parsons, later 2nd Earl of Rosse, and Alice Lloyd. He was educated at Trinity College Dublin and Magdalen College, Oxford, graduating with first-class honours in mathematics in 1822. He inherited an earldom and a large estate in King's County (now County Offaly) in Ireland when his father, Lawrence, 2nd Earl of Rosse, died in February 1841.

Lord Rosse married Mary Field, daughter of John Wilmer Field, on 14 April 1836. They had thirteen offspring, of which four sons survived to adulthood:

- Lawrence, 4th Earl of Rosse (known as Baron Oxmantown until 1867; 17 November 1840 – 30 August 1908).
- The Rev. Randal Parsons (26 April 1848 – 15 November 1936).
- The Hon. Richard Clere Parsons (21 February 1851 – 26 January 1923), apparently known for developing railways in South America.
- The Hon. Sir Charles Algernon Parsons (13 June 1854 – 11 February 1931), known for inventing the steam turbine.

In addition to his astronomical interests, Rosse served as a Member of Parliament (MP) for King's County from 1821 to 1834, president of the British Association in 1843–1844, an Irish representative peer after 1845, president of the Royal Society (1848–1854), and chancellor of the University of Dublin (Trinity College Dublin) (1862–1867). He was appointed Colonel of the disembodied King's County Royal Rifle Militia (a regiment formerly commanded by his father) from 19 June 1834 and was joined by his younger brother the Hon Lawrence Parsons as Lieutenant-Colonel from 24 December 1847. When the regiment was next embodied, in 1852, the position of colonel had become an honorary post.

== Scientific studies ==
During the 1840s, he had the Leviathan of Parsonstown built, a 72-inch (6 feet/1.83 m) telescope at Birr Castle, Parsonstown, County Offaly. The 72-inch (1.8 m) telescope replaced a 36-inch (910 mm) telescope that he had built previously. He had to invent many of the techniques he used for constructing the Leviathan, both because its size was without precedent and because earlier telescope builders had guarded their secrets or had not published their methods. Details of the metal, casting, grinding and polishing of the 3-ton 'speculum' were presented in 1844 at the Belfast Natural History Society. Rosse's telescope was considered a marvellous technical and architectural achievement, and images of it were circulated widely within the British Commonwealth. Building of the Leviathan began in 1842 and it was first used in 1845; regular use waited another two years, due to the Great Irish Famine. It was the world's largest telescope, in terms of aperture size, until the early 20th century. Using this telescope Rosse saw and catalogued a large number of nebulae (including a number that would later be recognised as galaxies).

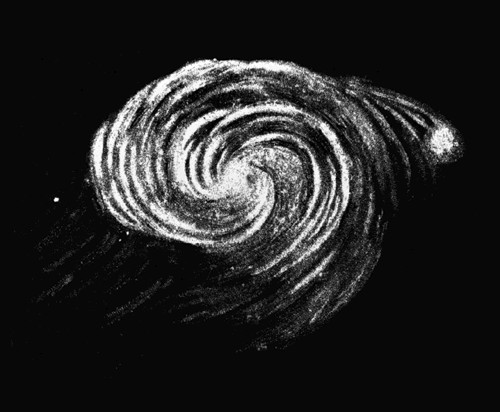
Drawing of the Whirlpool Galaxy by Rosse in 1845

Lord Rosse performed astronomical studies and discovered the spiral nature of some nebulae, today known to be spiral galaxies. Rosse's telescope Leviathan was the first to reveal the spiral structure of M51, a galaxy nicknamed later as the "Whirlpool Galaxy", and his drawings of it closely resemble modern photographs.

The Crab Nebula received its name based on a drawing made by Rosse in the early 1840s with his older 36-inch (91 cm) telescope in which it resembled a crab. A few years later, when the 72-inch (183 cm) telescope was in service, he (or one of his assistants) produced an improved drawing of a considerably different appearance, but the original name continued to be used.

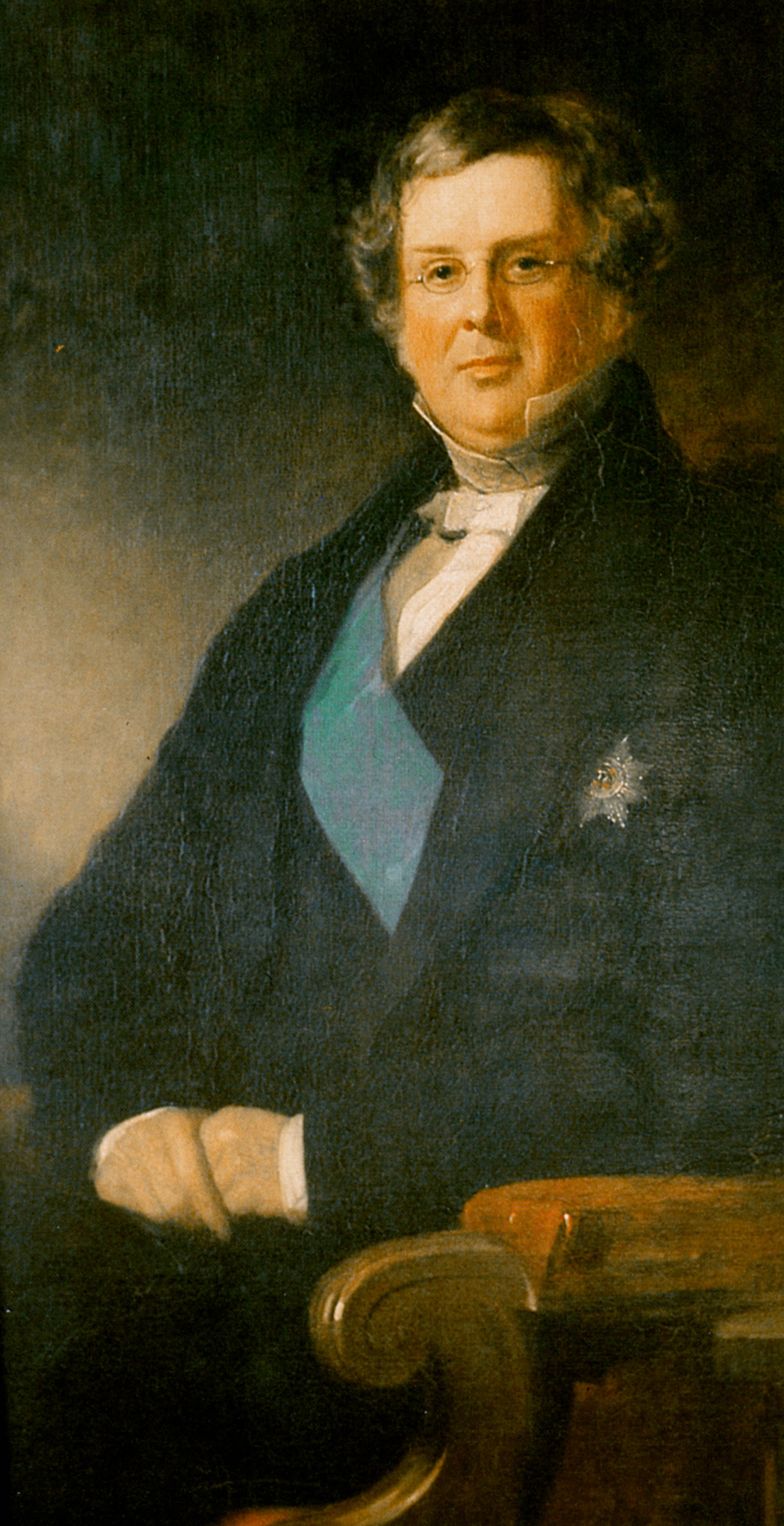
Lord Rosse

A main component of Rosse's nebular research was his attempt to resolve the nebular hypothesis, which posited that planets and stars were formed by gravity acting on gaseous nebulae. Rosse himself did not believe that nebulas were truly gaseous, arguing rather that they were made of such an amount of fine stars that most telescopes could not resolve them individually (that is, he considered nebulas to be stellar in nature). In 1845 Rosse and his technicians claimed to have resolved the Orion Nebula into its individual stars using the Leviathan, a claim which had considerable cosmological and even philosophical implications, as at the time there was considerable debate over whether or not the universe was "evolved" (in a pre-Darwinian sense), a concept which the nebular hypothesis supported and with which Rosse disagreed strongly. Rosse's primary opponent in this was John Herschel, who used his own instruments to claim that the Orion Nebula was a "true" nebula (i.e. gaseous, not stellar), and discounted Rosse's instruments as flawed (a criticism Rosse returned about Herschel's own). Eventually, neither man (nor telescope) could establish sufficiently scientific results to resolve the question (the convincing evidence for the gaseous nature of the nebula would be developed later from William Huggins's spectroscopic evidence, though it would not immediately resolve the philosophical issues).

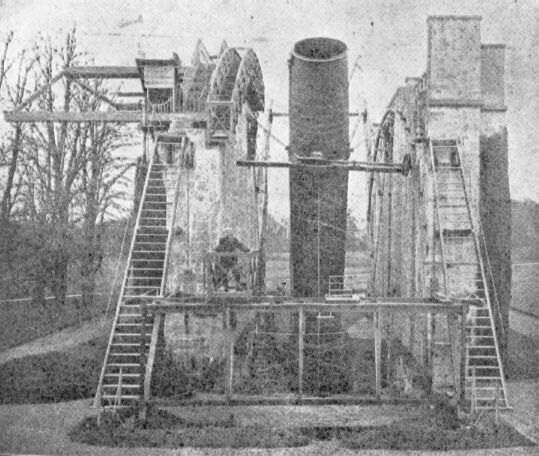
The largest telescope of the 19th century, the Leviathan of Parsonstown.

One of Rosse's telescope admirers was Thomas Langlois Lefroy, a fellow Irish MP, who said, "The planet Jupiter, which through an ordinary glass is no larger than a good star, is seen twice as large as the moon appears to the naked eye... But the genius displayed in all the contrivances for wielding this mighty monster even surpasses the design and execution of it. The telescope weighs sixteen tons, and yet Lord Rosse raised it single-handed off its resting place, and two men with ease raised it to any height."

Lord Rosse's son published his father's findings, including the discovery of 226 NGC objects in the publication Observations of Nebulae and Clusters of Stars Made With the Six-foot and Three-foot Reflectors at Birr Castle From the Year 1848 up to the Year 1878, Scientific Transactions of the Royal Dublin Society Vol. II, 1878.

== Lord Rosse's telescopes ==
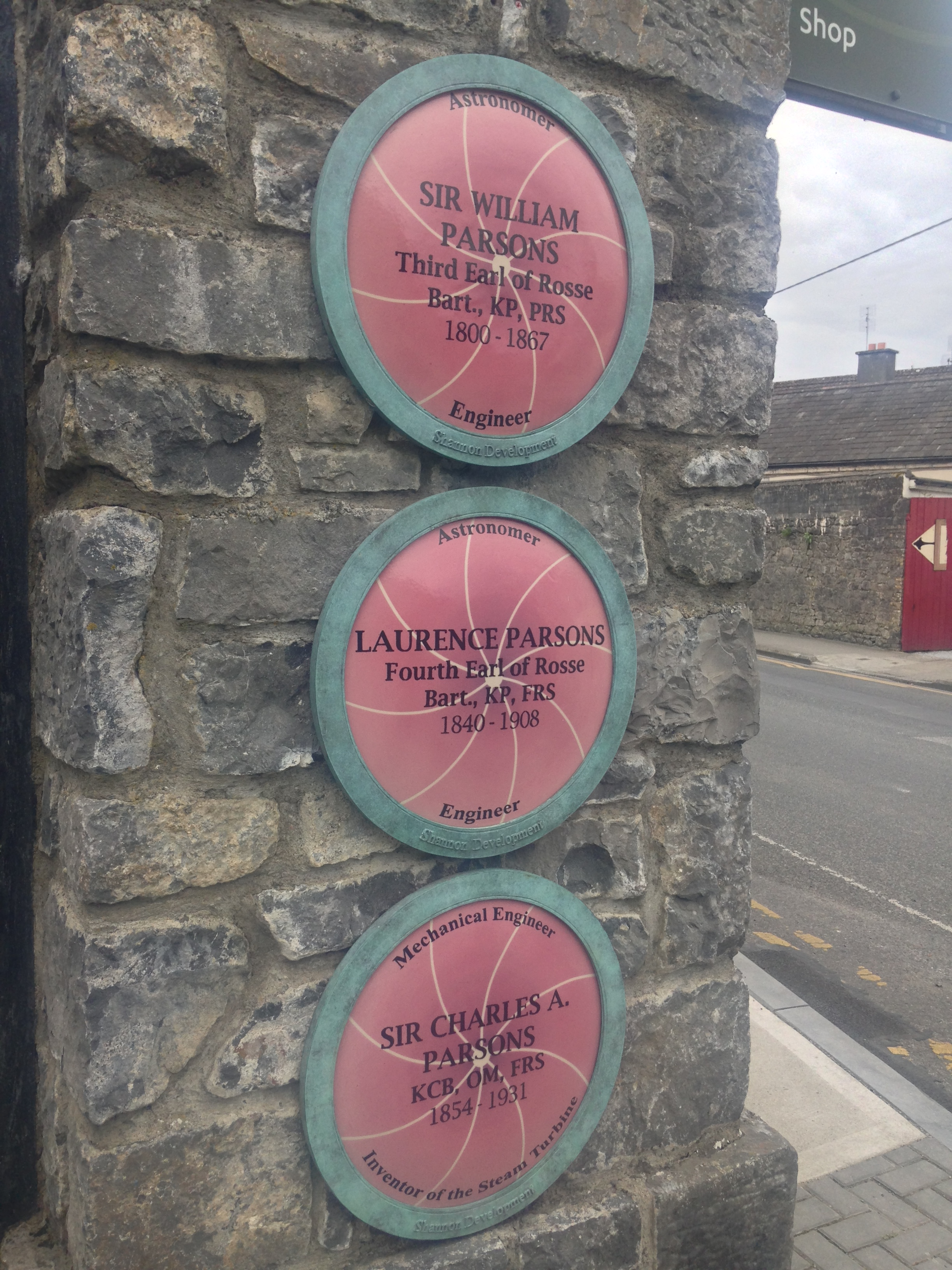
Parsons' plaque in Birr Castle

Lord Rosse had a variety of optical reflecting telescopes built. Rosse's telescopes used cast speculum metal ground parabolically and polished.

- 15-inch (38 cm)
- 24-inch (61 cm)
- 36-inch (91 cm) (aka Rosse 3-foot telescope)
- 72-inch (180 cm) (aka Rosse 6-foot telescope or "Leviathan of Parsonstown"), started in 1842 and completed in 1845.

== See also ==
- List of presidents of the Royal Society

Parliament of the United Kingdom
Preceded by Thomas Bernard; John Clere Parsons	Member of Parliament for King's County; 1821–1835; With: Thomas Bernard 1821–1833; Nicholas Fitzsimon 1833–1835	Succeeded by John Craven Westenra; Nicholas Fitzsimon
Political offices
Preceded by The Earl of Limerick	Representative peer for Ireland; 1845–1867	Succeeded by The Lord Dunboyne
Academic offices
Preceded by Lord John Beresford	Chancellor of the University of Dublin; 1862–1867	Succeeded by 1st Earl Cairns
Professional and academic associations
Preceded by Spencer Compton	27th President of the Royal Society; 1848–1854	Succeeded by John Wrottesley
Honorary titles
New title	Lord Lieutenant of King's County; 1831–1867	Succeeded by Thomas Bernard
Peerage of Ireland
Preceded by Lawrence Parsons	Earl of Rosse; 1841–1867	Succeeded by Lawrence Parsons
