= Desmond Parsons =

British aristocrat, sinologist, and aesthete

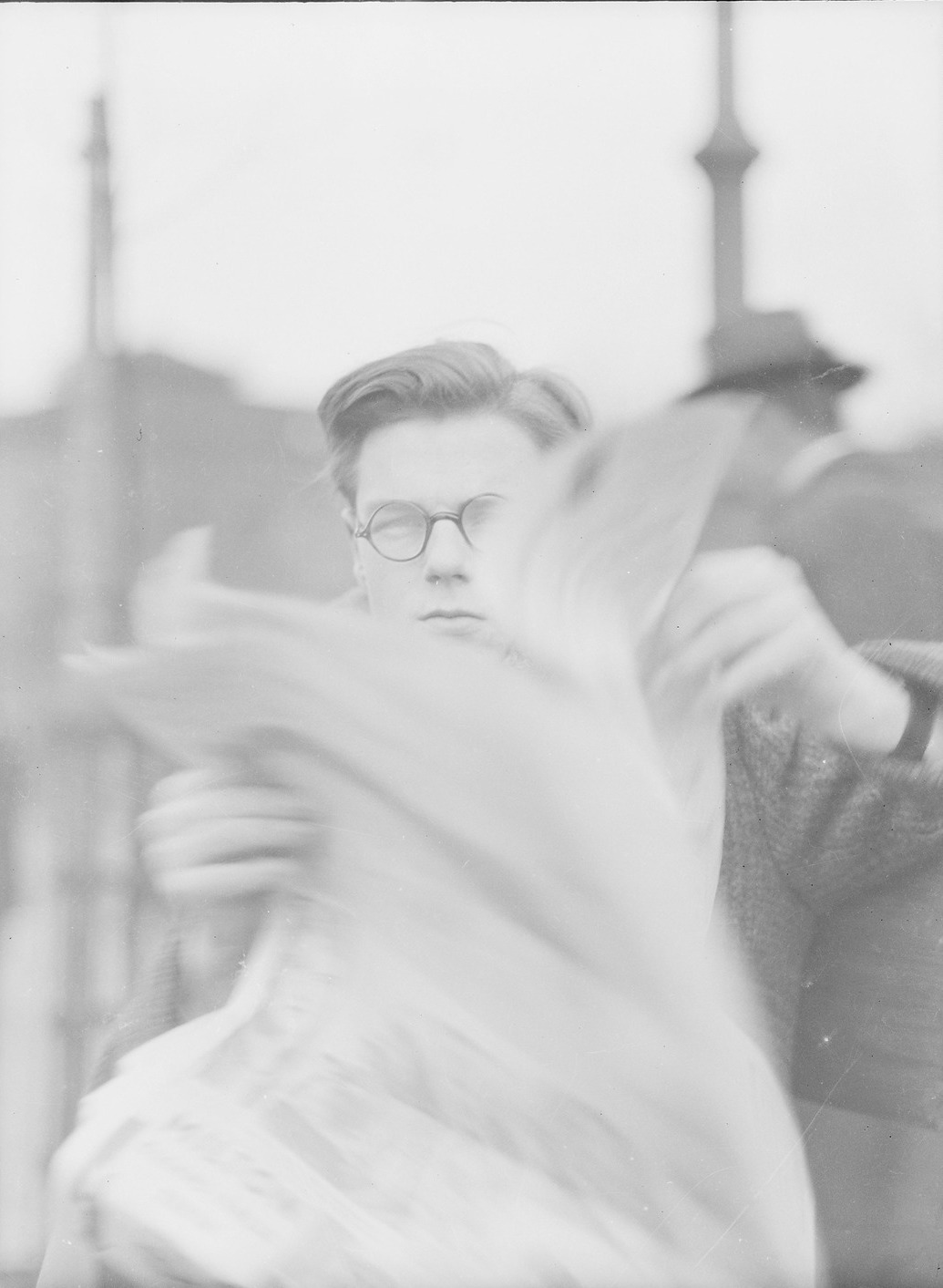
Desmond Parsons

Hon. Desmond Edward Parsons FRAS (13 December 1910 – 4 July 1937) was a British aristocrat, amateur sinologist, and aesthete, regarded as "one of the most magnetic men of his generation." He had a passionate friendship with James Lees-Milne, was the one true love of Harold Acton and the unrequited love of Robert Byron.

== Early life ==
Desmond Edward Parsons was born on 13 December 1910, the third child of William Parsons, 5th Earl of Rosse and Frances Lois Lister-Kaye (1882–1984), and the younger brother of Michael Parsons, 6th Earl of Rosse.

He studied at Eton College where he had a passionate friendship with James Lees-Milne. Parsons entered Oxford University and then the Royal Military Academy Sandhurst.

== Personal life ==
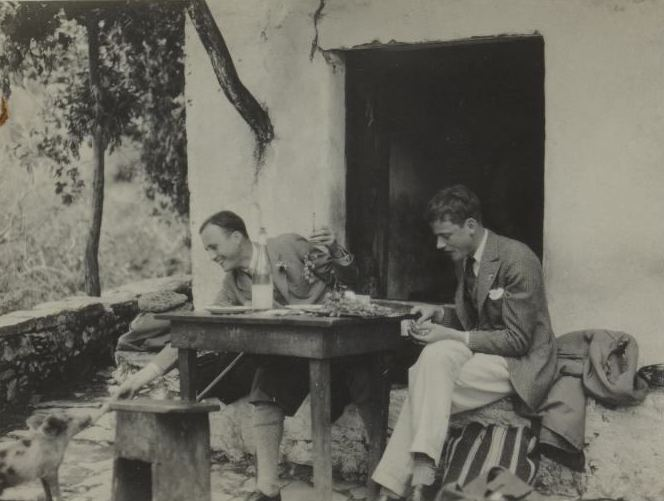
Robert Byron and Desmond Parsons in China

In 1934, Desmond Parsons, a brilliant linguist, went to China to reach his friend, and possible lover, Harold Acton who was in Beijing lecturing at the Peking National University. According to Acton's friends, Parsons was Acton's "one true love of his life".

In China Parsons visited the caves at Dun Huang. He removed a wall painting using tools and was caught when he tried to carry it away in his vehicle. He was released after the British government intervened. His photographs of the place were later acquired by the Courtauld Institute of Art.

Parsons was also the great, but unreciprocated love of Robert Byron, a travel writer. In 1934 they lived together in Peking, where Parsons developed Hodgkin's Disease. His brother, who was visiting him, managed to bring back Parsons to Europe where he died on 4 July 1937. Byron died in 1941 when the ship he was travelling on was attacked during World War II.

== Legacy ==
At the beginning of the World War II, Acton sent back to Birr Castle Parsons' collection of Chinese Art. The journal of the Royal Asiatic Society, of which he had become a resident member in the year of his death, honoured him with an obituary noting his "unusual capacity for observation" and "fine scholarly instinct" as well as "charming personality and transparent honesty of purpose".
