= Thomas Bernard (Irish politician) =

Thomas Bernard (c. 1769 – 18 May 1834) was an Irish politician.

He was the son of Thomas Bernard of Castle Bernard, Birr, King's County (now County Offaly), and his first wife, Mary, daughter of Jonathan Willington, of Castle Willington. He commissioned the building of a new gothic mansion on the family estate named Kinnitty Castle.

He was appointed High Sheriff of King's County for 1798–1799. He was then elected at the 1802 general election as a Member of Parliament (MP) for King's County (now County Offaly), holding the seat until 1833.

He died intestate in Dublin in 1834. He had married twice: firstly the Hon. Elizabeth Prittie, daughter of Henry Prittie, 1st Baron Dunalley, and secondly Catherine Henrietta, the daughter of Francis Hely-Hutchinson, MP, with whom he had four sons and two daughters. His estate passed to his eldest son Thomas, an army officer.

Parliament of the United Kingdom
Preceded by Sir Laurence Parsons; Denis Bowes Daly	Member of Parliament for King's County; 1802–1833; With: Sir Laurence Parsons 1802–1807; Hardress Lloyd 1807–1818; John Clere Parsons 1818–1821; William Parsons, Baron Oxmantown 1821–1833	Succeeded by William Parsons, Baron Oxmantown; Nicholas Fitzsimon
