= Birr Castle =

17th-century castle with demesne, telescopes and science museum

- Caisleán Bhiorra
- Birr, County Offaly
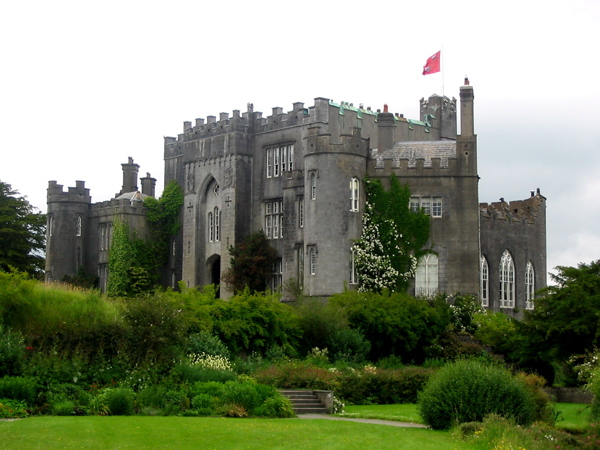

Site information
- Type: Castle
- Owner: Brendan Parsons, 7th Earl of Rosse

Location
- Shown within Ireland
- Location within Ireland
- Coordinates: 53.09536°N 7.91476°W

Site history
- Built: 1170

Birr Castle (Irish: Caisleán Bhiorra) is a castle in the town of Birr in County Offaly, Ireland. It is the home of Brendan Parsons, 7th Earl of Rosse and his family, and as such the castle is generally not open to the public, though the grounds and gardens of the demesne are publicly accessible, and include a science museum and a café, a reflecting telescope which was the largest in the world for decades and a modern radio telescope.

== History ==
There has been a castle on the site since 1170, and from the 14th to the 17th centuries the O'Carroll family ruled from here over an area known as "Ely O'Carroll".

After the death of Sir Charles O'Carroll, Sir Lawrence Parsons (died 1628) was granted Birr Castle and 1,277 acres (5.2 km^{2}) of land in 1620. Parsons engaged English masons in the construction of a new castle. This construction took place, not on the site of the O'Carrolls' Black Tower (since disappeared), but at its gatehouse. "Flankers" were added to the gatehouse diagonally at either side, giving the castle the plan it retains today.

After the death of Sir Laurence Parsons and of his elder son Richard, the castle passed to his younger son William. During the Irish Rebellion of 1641, William was besieged at Parsonstown (as Birr was then) by Catholic forces for fifteen months. After the civil war, William's son Laurence (baronet from 1677) refurbished the castle.

A later descendant—Laurence Parsons, 2nd Earl of Rosse—also engaged in some re-building, and heightened and "Gothicised" the castle in the early 19th century. In turn, his son, the 3rd Earl of Rosse, was responsible for the construction of the great telescope at Birr. When completed in 1845, it was the largest telescope on Earth, and capable of capturing more light and seeing further into space than any telescope had done before. Birr, therefore, became a focus for astronomical observations, and visitors came to visit the observatory from all over the world—including Charles Babbage and H.I.H. Napoléon Eugène, Prince Imperial.

When the 3rd Earl died, his sons continued the scientific tradition, and Lawrence Parsons, 4th Earl of Rosse is noted for measuring the heat of the moon. After his death in 1908, however, the telescope fell into disrepair; the mirror was taken to the Science Museum in London, and, circa 1914, the telescope's metal supporting structure was melted down to be used in the First World War. In 1925, the wooden structures around the walls were demolished for safety reasons.

Following several intermediate restoration attempts, the telescope was restored more completely in the late 1990s.

In 2025, the Irish Historic Astronomical Observatories, consisting of Dunsink Observatory, Birr Castle and Armagh Observatory, were added to the World Heritage Tentative List, a step towards becoming a UNESCO World Heritage Site.

== The Demesne ==
=== Location ===
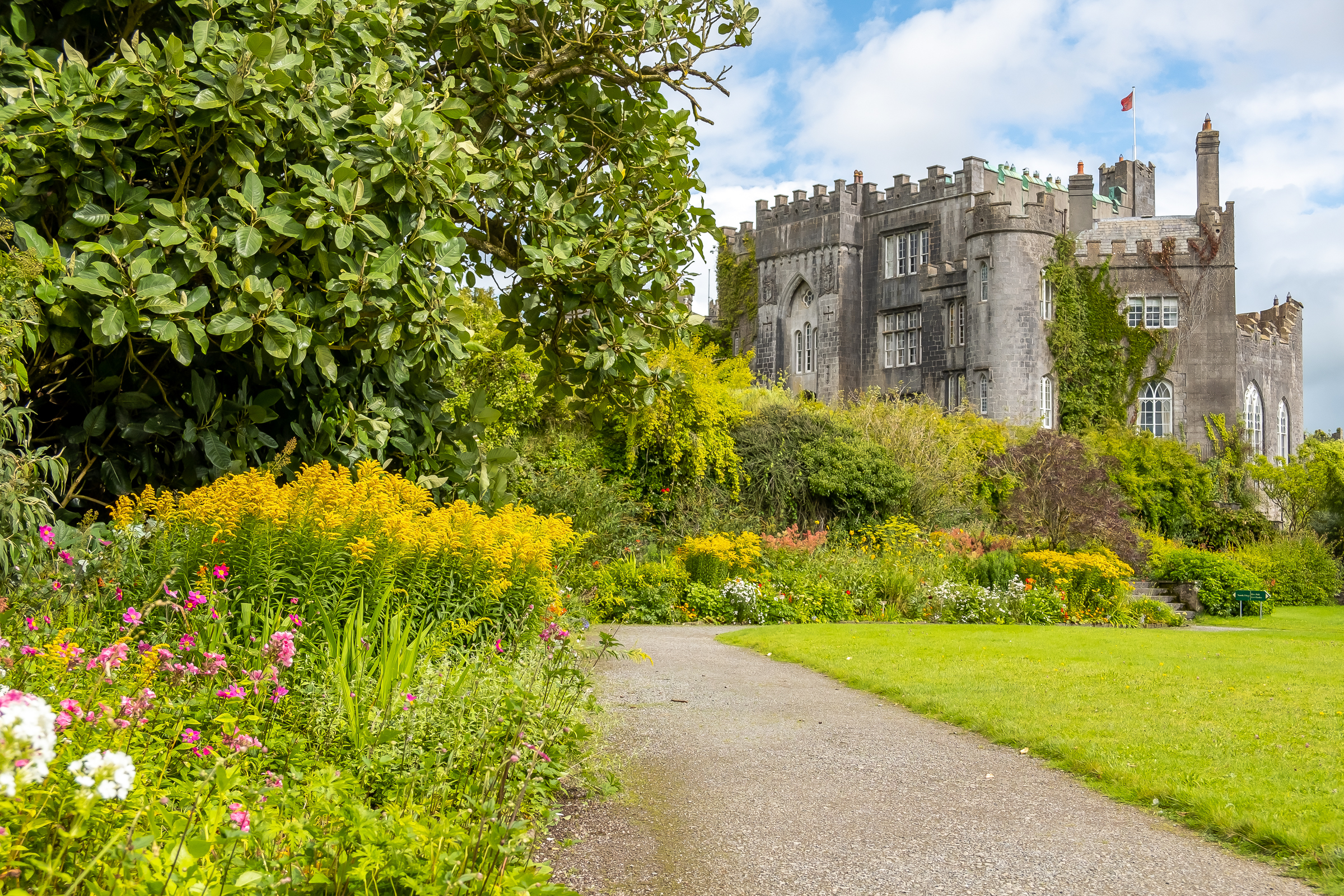
The castle

The demesne runs south and south-east of Birr town centre. The main public entrance is through a courtyard; there is no direct public access to the castle, which faces into the demesne, with an internal gate on a bridge over a dry moat separating the castle's inner surrounds from the broader parkland. The entrance courtyard contains the Science Centre, café, shop and garden entrance, while the family have an ornamental private road gateway, with a large adjoining gate lodge, occupied by a staff member, just to the north.

Banner of the Earl of Rosse, flown atop the castle

Birr's main river, the River Camcor, enters the demesne near the castle, and continues through a pond to flow into the Little Brosna River, which in turn marks the border between Counties Offaly and Tipperary, and flows on to the Shannon. The demesne is open to the public for a fee, with an annual subscription available for Friends of Birr Castle Demesne.

=== Ireland's Historic Science Centre ===
The castle grounds are also home to Ireland's Historic Science Centre, a museum of Ireland's historic scientists and their contributions to astronomy and botany. The museum lies within a courtyard off William Street. Its displays touch on astronomy, engineering, photography, botany and other topics. Laurence Parsons, 4th Earl of Rosse and his mother, Mary Parsons, Countess of Rosse, were eminent photographers, and her darkroom, which is also on show within the museum, is believed to be the oldest surviving example in the world.

=== Café and shop ===
The Castle Courtyard Café and a small shop are in the same courtyard as the Science Centre.

=== Parklands and gardens ===
The grounds of the castle contain the oldest wrought-iron bridge in Ireland, dating from 1820. There was also an early hydroelectric station by the bridge and castle.

The walled gardens in the grounds feature Box Hedges that are over 300 years old. They are also, according to The Guinness Book of Records, the tallest hedge in the world.

The Irish entry to the 2014 European Tree of the Year contest was the Birr Castle Grey Poplar (Populus × canescens). In February 2014, while voting was still open, it was blown down in a storm.

=== Membership and sponsorship ===
The demesne's charitable foundation offers quarterly, half-yearly and annual memberships, including unlimited visiting.

The grounds also contain a plantation of sequoia redwoods from California, Giants' Grove, organised by the estate and Crann, which are available for sponsorship, and the trees from a past sponsorship scheme operated with the Tree Council of Ireland.

== Astronomy ==
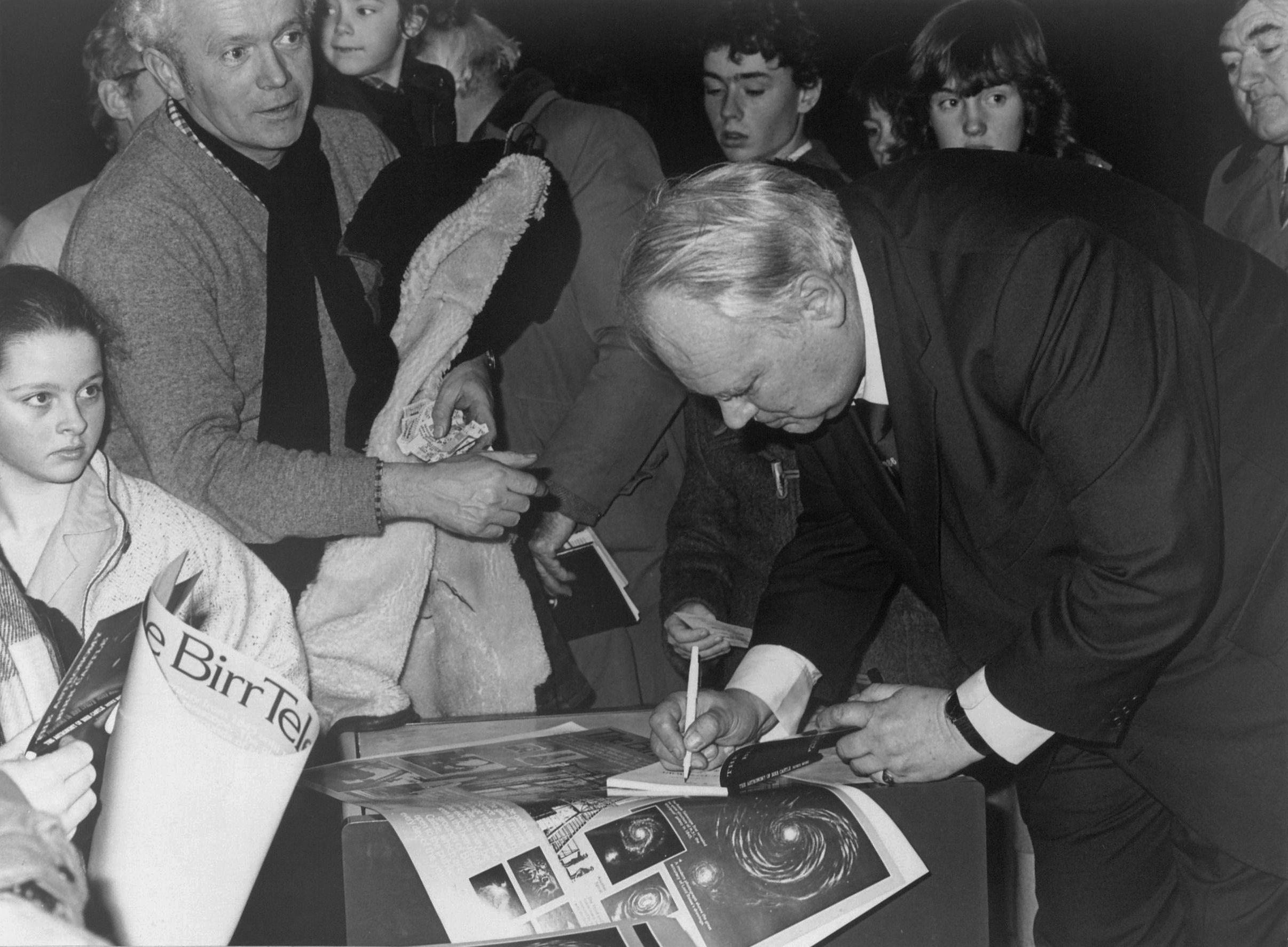
Patrick Moore signing his book The Astronomy of Birr Castle at NIHE – 1985

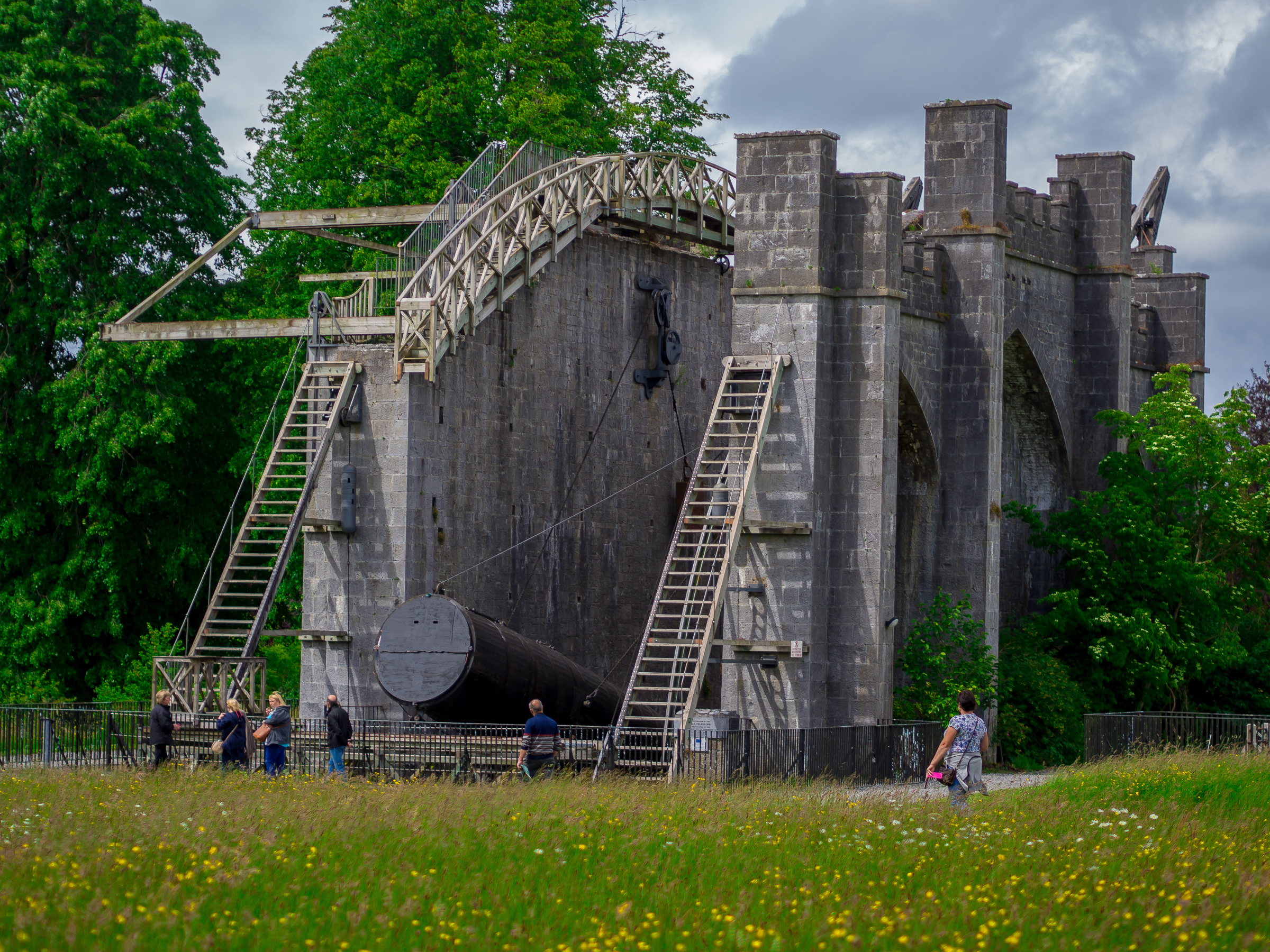
Leviathan of Parsonstown

=== The "Great Telescope" – The Leviathan ===
A major feature on the grounds of the castle is the "Great Telescope" or Leviathan of Parsonstown or The Rosse Telescope of William Parsons, 3rd Earl of Rosse, an astronomical telescope with a 183-cm (72 in) reflector. It was completed in 1845 and was used for several decades before the last observations were made in the first years of the 20th century. Its record size was not surpassed until the completion of the 100-inch (2.5-meter) Hooker Telescope at Mount Wilson Observatory in 1917. It was dismantled in 1914, but the structure was restored and the telescope reconstructed in the 1990s and is accessible to the public, with occasional demonstrations of its movement, and talks.

=== Modern radio astronomy ===
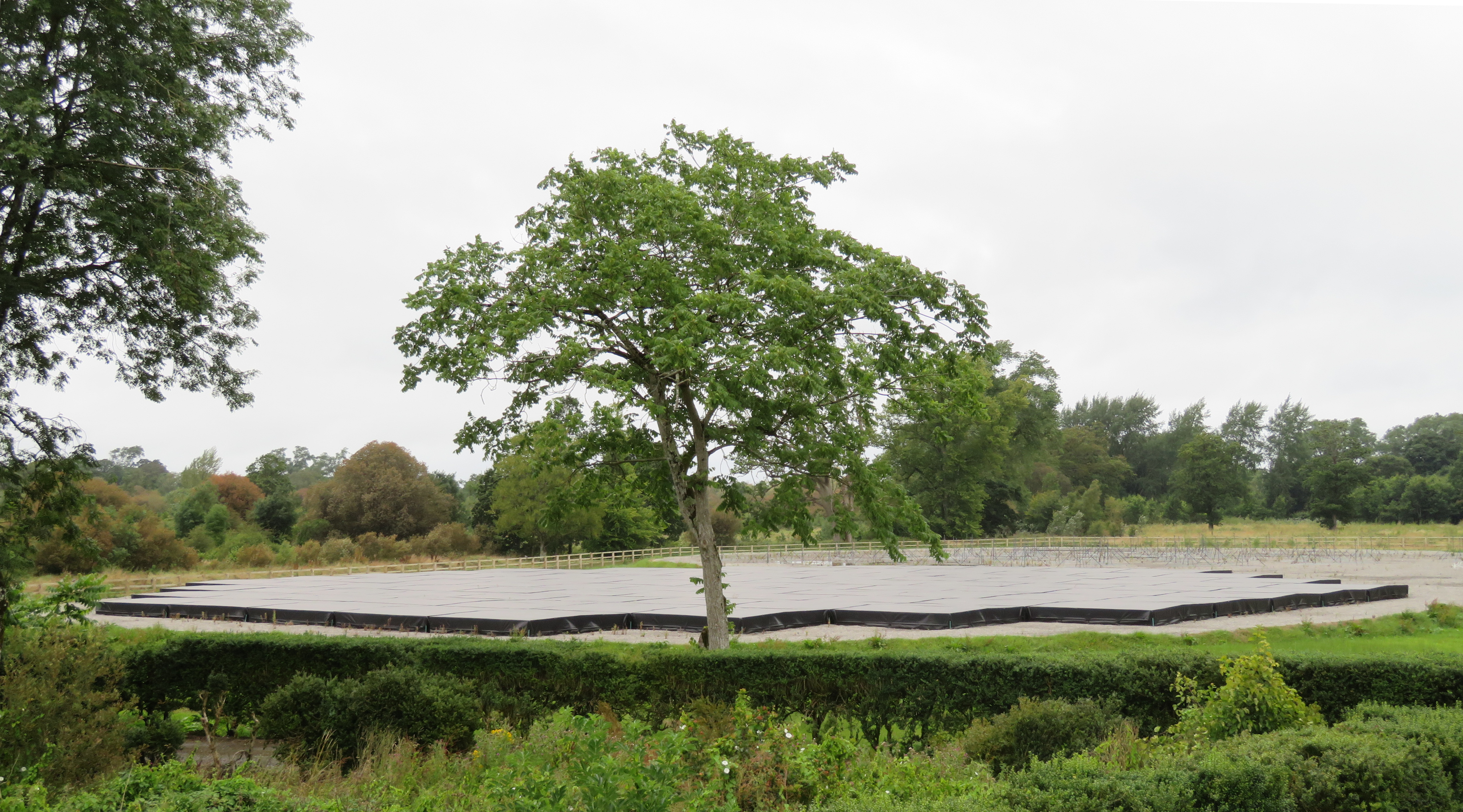
The Irish node of the low-frequency array I-LOFAR radio telescope in the castle grounds

Trinity College Dublin leases land on the grounds of Birr Castle Demesne on which they operate the Rosse Observatory, which includes the Irish station of the LOFAR network, known as I-LOFAR, as well as some other smaller radio telescopes. I-LOFAR is operated on behalf of a consortium of Irish educational institutions. These operations have brought astronomical research activity back to Birr after a century-long gap since the decommissioning of the Leviathan.

The astronomical projects are situated near the Little Brosna River and the County Tipperary border. Astrophysicist Peter T. Gallagher, then of Trinity College Dublin, met Lord Rosse in 2010 while visiting the demesne in search of suitable quiet sites for radio-telescopy projects, and they agreed to repurpose an old sheep yard. The agreement led to the establishment of the Rosse Solar-Terrestrial Observatory, a Trinity College Dublin project, which was formally opened and blessed on 28 June 2014 (though already fully functional), with antennae picking up solar activity, even in cloudy weather. The sheep pen building was converted into a control room, and a magnetometer, jointly operated between TCD and the Dublin Institute for Advanced Studies, was also installed. Already by 2012, solar bursts were being documented, and a major solar burst was detected by the Birr system in 2014 and reported in Nature Physics.

In the meantime, the project team started work on establishing the I-LOFAR radio-telescope station (IE613), a node in a Europe-spanning network, which was largely built in 2016, and had its first light opening ceremony on 27 July 2017. It was constructed in fields in the Mount Palmer area, between the Rivers Camcor and Little Brosna. As an international LOFAR station it has twice the number of antennas of a Dutch remote station, and four times the number of antennas of a core Dutch station. It consists of 192 antennas (96 antennas, each with two polarisations) for each antenna type for a total of 384 antennas. I-LOFAR is the westernmost station in the LOFAR network (the easternmost station is at Irbene in Latvia). The I-LOFAR telescope, in 2018, observed for the first time a billion-year-old red-dwarf, flare star called CN Leo, almost 75 trillion kilometres away. There is a viewing point provided for visitors to the demesne to overlook the telescope structure.
