= Armstrong baronets of Gallen Priory (1841) =

The Armstrong baronetcy, of Gallen Priory in the King's County, was created on 18 September 1841 for Andrew Armstrong, Receiver-General of Stamps in Ireland and Member of Parliament for King's County from 1841 to 1852. The Armstrong family was Scotch-Irish, originally from the Scottish Borders.

The 3rd Baronet was High Sheriff of King's County in 1914.

== Armstrong baronets, of Gallen Priory (1841) ==
- Sir Andrew Armstrong, 1st Baronet (1786–1863)
- Sir Edmund Frederick Armstrong, 2nd Baronet (1836–1899)
- Sir Andrew Harvey Armstrong, 3rd Baronet (1866–1922)
- Sir Nesbitt William Armstrong, 4th Baronet (1875–1953)
- Sir Andrew St Clare Armstrong, 5th Baronet (1912–1987)
- Sir Andrew Clarence Francis Armstrong, CMG, 6th Baronet (1907–1997)
- Sir Christopher John Edmund Stuart Armstrong, 7th Baronet (born 1940)

The heir apparent is the present holder's son Charles Andrew Armstrong (born 1973).
