= 1891 North Kilkenny by-election =

UK Parliamentary by-election

The 1891 North Kilkenny by-election was a parliamentary by-election held for the United Kingdom House of Commons constituency of North Kilkenny on 29 October 1891. The vacancy arose because of the death of the sitting member, Sir John Pope Hennessy of the Irish Parliamentary Party, three weeks earlier. Sir John had been elected in a hard-fought and bitter by-election the previous December, following the split in the Party between the supporters and opponents of Charles Stewart Parnell. On this occasion, however, only one candidate was nominated, Patrick McDermott of the Irish National Federation, who was elected unopposed.
