= Andrew Armstrong =

Andrew Armstrong may refer to:

- Sir Andrew Armstrong, 1st Baronet (1786–1863), Irish politician
- Andrew Armstrong (American football) (born 2000), American football player
- Andrew R. Armstrong (1885–1968), American labor leader and politician
- Sir Andrew Armstrong, 3rd Baronet (1866–1922) of the Armstrong baronets
- Sir Andrew Armstrong, 5th Baronet (1912–1987) of the Armstrong baronets
- Sir Andrew Armstrong, 6th Baronet (1907–1997) of the Armstrong baronets
- Andrew Armstrong of DPP v Armstrong
- Andrew Marsicano Armstrong, father of American musician Billie Joe Armstrong

== See also ==
- Andy Armstrong (disambiguation)
