= 1902 North Kilkenny by-election =

UK parliamentary by-election

The 1902 North Kilkenny by-election was held on 26 February 1902 after resignation of the incumbent MP Patrick McDermott of the Irish Parliamentary Party. The IPP's candidate Joseph Devlin was unopposed and so was returned as the MP.
