= David Sherlock =

David Sherlock may refer to:

- David Sherlock (writer)
- David Sherlock (MP)
