= Michael Reddy (politician) =

Irish politician

Michael Reddy (died 30 July 1919) was an Irish nationalist politician from County Offaly.

He was a farmer from Shannonbridge, and a local councillor.

A member of the Irish Parliamentary Party, he was elected at the 1900 general election as the Member of Parliament (MP) for Birr, and held the seat until the constituency was abolished at the 1918 general election.

Parliament of the United Kingdom
Preceded by Bernard Charles Molloy	Member of Parliament for King's County Birr; 1900 – 1918	Constituency abolished See King's County
