= 1906 North Kilkenny by-election =

UK parliamentary by-election

The 1906 North Kilkenny by-election was held on 3 March 1906 after Joseph Devlin resigned. Devlin had been elected for the Irish Parliamentary Party in the 1906 general election for both North Kilkenny and West Belfast. He chose to sit for West Belfast, creating a vacancy in North Kilkenny.

The seat was retained by Michael Meagher who stood for the Irish Parliamentary Party. The by-election was uncontested.
