= James Drought =

James Drought may refer to:

- James William Drought, American author
- James Drought (theologian), Irish academic
