= Bernard Charles Molloy =

Irish lawyer, soldier and politician (1842 – 1916)

Bernard Charles Molloy (1842 – 26 June 1916) was an Irish lawyer, soldier and politician. His brother was James Lynam Molloy, a successful Irish composer.

== Life ==
Molloy was educated at St. Edmund's College, Ware and at the University of France and the University of Bonn. He became a barrister in the Middle Temple in 1872. He was a captain in the French Army and won a gold medal for his service during the Franco-Prussian war. He was also Private Chamberlain in the court of the Vatican.

In 1874 he ran for election as member of parliament for the constituency of King's County. He was not elected, but ran again and won in 1880, and in 1885 was elected for the new division of Birr for the Home Rule party, a seat which he held until the general election of 1900. He was a Middle Temple lawyer and penal reformer.

He resided at Drummond Lodge, near Milltownpass County Westmeath.

== Notes ==
Parliament of the United Kingdom
| Preceded by John Westenra; Sir Andrew Armstrong | Member of Parliament for King's County; 1880 – 1885; With: Sir Patrick O'Brien 1852–1885 | Constituency divided |
| New constituency | Member of Parliament for King's County Birr; 1885 – 1900 | Succeeded by Michael Reddy |
