= Drought family (Ireland) =

Drought
- Coat of arms of Drought
- Current region: Eastern and Midland Region, Ireland
- Founded: Unknown; Before c. 1600
- Historic seat: Droughtville (The Heath); Lettybrook; Whigsborough; Oldglass
- Motto: Semper sitiens (Always thirsty)

The Droughts are an Irish family. They were once considered one of the principal families in the King's County (modern-day Offaly) in the Eastern and Midland Region of Ireland.

A numerous family, they are believed to have settled in County Carlow around the year 1600. They later spread to County Kildare, and the King's and Queen's Counties towards the end of the 17th century.

== History ==
=== 17th century settlements ===
It is believed that the Drought family settled in County Carlow around the year 1600.

In the middle of the 17th century, during the Cromwellian conquest of Ireland, the family was awarded substantial chunks of land in Kinnitty, near Birr, in King's County. By the close of the century, the Droughts had spread to the surrounding areas of Kinnitty, as well as County Kildare and Queen's County (now County Laois).

In King's County, the Droughts first resided in Cappagowlan, near Ballyboy, with later branches of the family settling in nearby Droughtville, Lettybrook, and Whigsborough. They soon established themselves as one of the principal families of the county.

=== Origins ===
Historian Edward Keane stated that a family of Droett, which was later spelt Drought, came to Ireland from the Netherlands in the 13th century. This supposition was later published in the 1862 edition of Burke's Landed Gentry, which stated that the first of the Drought family was Smerger Drought, who appeared to have come to Ireland from the Netherlands in the 13th century, however Burke noted that no perfect record was traceable from that period.

The Drought name is derived from the Irish words or epithets 'droichead' or 'an droichid' meaning, respectively, 'bridge', or 'of the bridge'. Irish genealogist Edward MacLysaght suggested that this may refer to a bridge an early bearer had been associated with or built.

Drought appears in the Irish Faints as O' Droughie and O'Drought, and belonged primarily to County Offaly and County Westmeath. Rev. Patrick Woulfe believed that the Droughts of this region were early immigrants from England of Frankish origin.

Some early and even modern forms of Drought may give rise to confusion with Drew. For example, in County Westmeath the two names are recorded as being synonymous with each other. In The Description of Ireland in 1598, historian Edmund Hogan remarked that the Droughts of County Offaly and County Carlow "seem to have been in Ireland since the 13th century", however MacLysaght proposed that Hogan in this instance had perhaps confused Drought with Drew.

MacLysaght has also suggested that the somewhat similar rare Irish surname Ó'Droichid (anglicized as O'Drehhitt), which was found at Kenry, County Limerick, in 1587, could be linked to the Drought family. Ó'Droichid has since become Bridgeman by semi-translation.

=== After the 17th century ===
Many members of the Drought family served as High Sheriff of King's County in the 18th and 19th centuries, beginning with John Drought of Whigsborough, who was appointed in 1780. Other members of the Drought family served as High Sheriff of Carlow and High Sheriff of Wicklow.

==== Droughtville ====
The Droughtville townland in the historic barony of Ballyboy is named after the Drought family who settled there. It was the seat of Thomas Drought, Esq., in 1786, and the principle residence of the Drought family in the middle of the 19th century. It was commonly called The Heath.

The townland, once considered a place of note, contained a house and demesne. The demesne was composed of peculiar groups of conical hills, forming a scene described as 'picturesque and pleasing'. To the end of the demesne was a marsh named 'Muddy Lake', which had the colloquial name of 'Island Lough'. On the north side of the marsh were the remains of Kiltubrid Castle.

Droughtville is contiguous to Lettybrook and Kinnitty Castle. In 1656, Captain Thomas Armstrong Drought of Cromwell's army was awarded a substantial chunk of confiscated land in Kinnitty, near Birr. He became the local sheriff, tasked with keeping the populace down, and built a fortified house on the site known as Moneyguyneen House, which sits on the estate of present-day Kinnitty Castle.

The land near Droughtville was considered some of the best pasture ground in the barony. Also in the vicinity of Droughtville was the ancient church of Drumcullin.

Within Droughtville remains a house known today as Heath Lodge, which was built c. 1750. The limestone house contains a decorative bat wing fanlight, and other elements of architectural significance, such as limestone sills and tall timber sash windows. Although no longer used, the principle avenue to the house with decorative cast-iron gates and railings flanked by limestone piers and gate lodge in the past provided a grand entrance to the estate.

==== Lettybrook ====
In the 20th century, the Drought family of Lettybrook were said to have often entertained visitors from England, especially retired army officers, who would spend a week grouse shooting on the mountains. In 1920, during the Irish War of Independence, the Drought's Lettybrook home was successfully raided by the Cadamstown IRA unit for weapons. Twenty rifles, ten revolvers, and a quantity of ammunition were taken. Later, Captain Drought requested the return of one of the guns, which had belonged to their son who had been killed in the Great War. Upon returning the rifle, Captain Drought was thankful, and let it be known that there were additional weapons in the house, which were duly collected.

Around 1860, respected Gothic-style architect Benjamin Woodward sketched potential alterations for gothicising a Georgian country house which closely resembles Lettybrook, however the work was not undertaken. The name Captain Droght [sic] occurs in one of Woodward's notebooks held by the National Gallery of Ireland.

Captain Alexander Drought of Lettybrook died in 1859. In 1862, architect Thomas Newenham Deane, who was a partner to Woodward, designed a house for Drought's first cousin, William Henry Head of nearby Derrylahan Park, father of Lieutenant–Colonel Charles Octavius Head.

The Droughts of Lettybrook were said to be distantly related to George Gresson of Glencairn, a wealthy Dublin lawyer.

==== Whigsborough ====
The Drought family built a house known as Whigsborough House in 1714, near Parsonstown, and lived there for 250 years, modifying the home in 1780 and again in the early 1800s to add a ballroom. It is said to have been built on the previous site of an O'Molloy castle.

==== Queen's County (County Laois) ====
Granston Manor (formerly Oldglass) in 1904. Built by the Drought family in the early 19th century.

In around 1800, the Drought family built an estate called Oldglass (now Granston Manor) in Ballacolla, County Laois.

The Droughts were succeeded there by the Whites family, from whom the place passed by purchase to the late Richard Fitzpatrick, Esq., who bequeathed the manor to his brother, Lord Castletown, who then made it his family mansion.

The mansion was partially burned down in the late 20th century.

== Prominent family members ==
- James Drought (born 1738) was an Irish theologian who became a fellow of Trinity College in 1762 and was a Regius Professor of Divinity from 1790 to 1819.
- John Head Drought of Lettybrook (born 1790) served as lieutenant-colonel for the British Army's 13th regiment of Light Dragoons in the Napoleonic Wars.
- Thomas Armstrong Drought served for 41 years in the British Army, the last ten as lieutenant-colonel commanding for the 15th (York, East Riding) regiment. He commanded the entire of the troops in the British Crown Colony of Ceylon (modern-day Sri Lanka) during the successful suppression of the rebellion in 1848. For his service, he received the thanks of the Queen.
- Captain John Drought was a member of the 18th century Irish Volunteer corps.

== See also ==
- Kinnitty Castle
