= John Gilbert King =

Irish politician

John Gilbert King MP

Member of Parliament for King's County
- In office 24 July 1865 – 23 November 1868 Serving with Patrick O'Brien
- Preceded by: Patrick O'Brien; John Pope Hennessy
- Succeeded by: Patrick O'Brien; David Sherlock

Personal details
- Born: 1822
- Died: 9 January 1901 (aged 78)
- Party: Conservative
- Parent(s): Henry King; Harriett Lloyd

John Gilbert King (1822 – 9 January 1901) was an Irish Conservative Party politician.

== Family ==
He was the son of Henry King and Harriett, daughter of John Lloyd, who had been a Member of the Irish House of Commons for King's County before the Act of Union. He inherited Ballylin House from his father in 1857 and, because he was unmarried with no children, this was passed to his nephew Henry Louis Mahon, son of Ross Mahon and Harriett King.

== Political career ==
At the 1865 general election, he was elected to the House of Commons of the United Kingdom as one of the two Members of Parliament (MPs) for King's County. He stood down at the next election, in 1868.

== Other activities ==
He was a Justice of the Peace and High Sheriff of King's County for 1852–53.

Parliament of the United Kingdom
Preceded by Patrick O'Brien; John Pope Hennessy	Member of Parliament for King's County; 1865 – 1868; With: Patrick O'Brien	Succeeded by Patrick O'Brien; David Sherlock
