= Muir baronets =

Baronetcy in the Baronetage of the United Kingdom

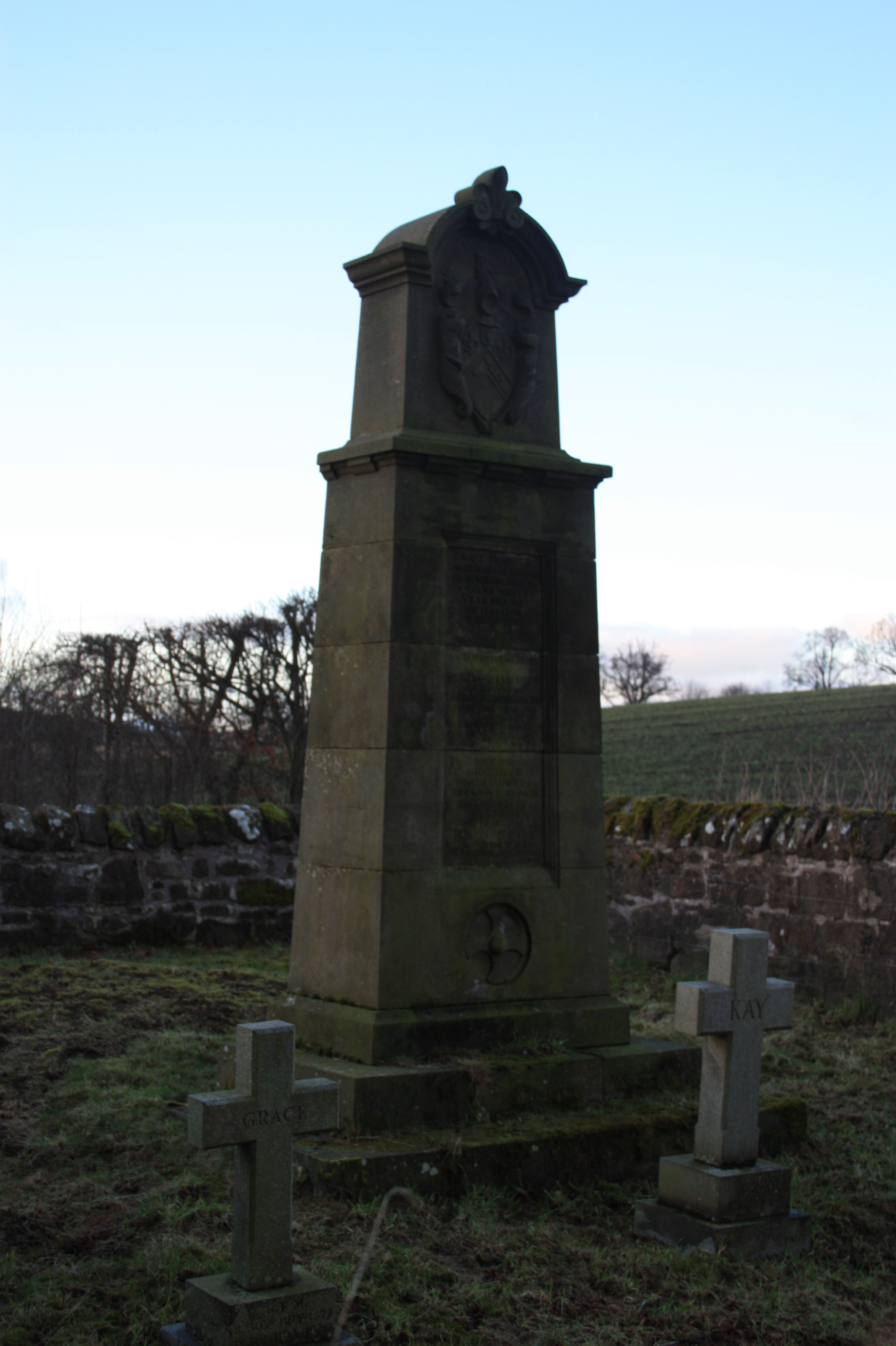
The grave of Sir John Muir of Deanston, Kincardine-in-Menteith

The Muir baronetcy, of Deanston in the county of Perth, and of Park Gardens in the city of Glasgow, is a title in the Baronetage of the United Kingdom. It was created on 20 October 1892 for John Muir, Lord Provost of Glasgow from 1889 to 1892.

The 2nd Baronet served as High Sheriff of County Waterford in 1919. The 3rd Baronet was a deputy lieutenant of Perthshire.

The 4th Baronet did not use his title.

== Muir baronets, of Deanston and Park Gardens, Glasgow (1892) ==
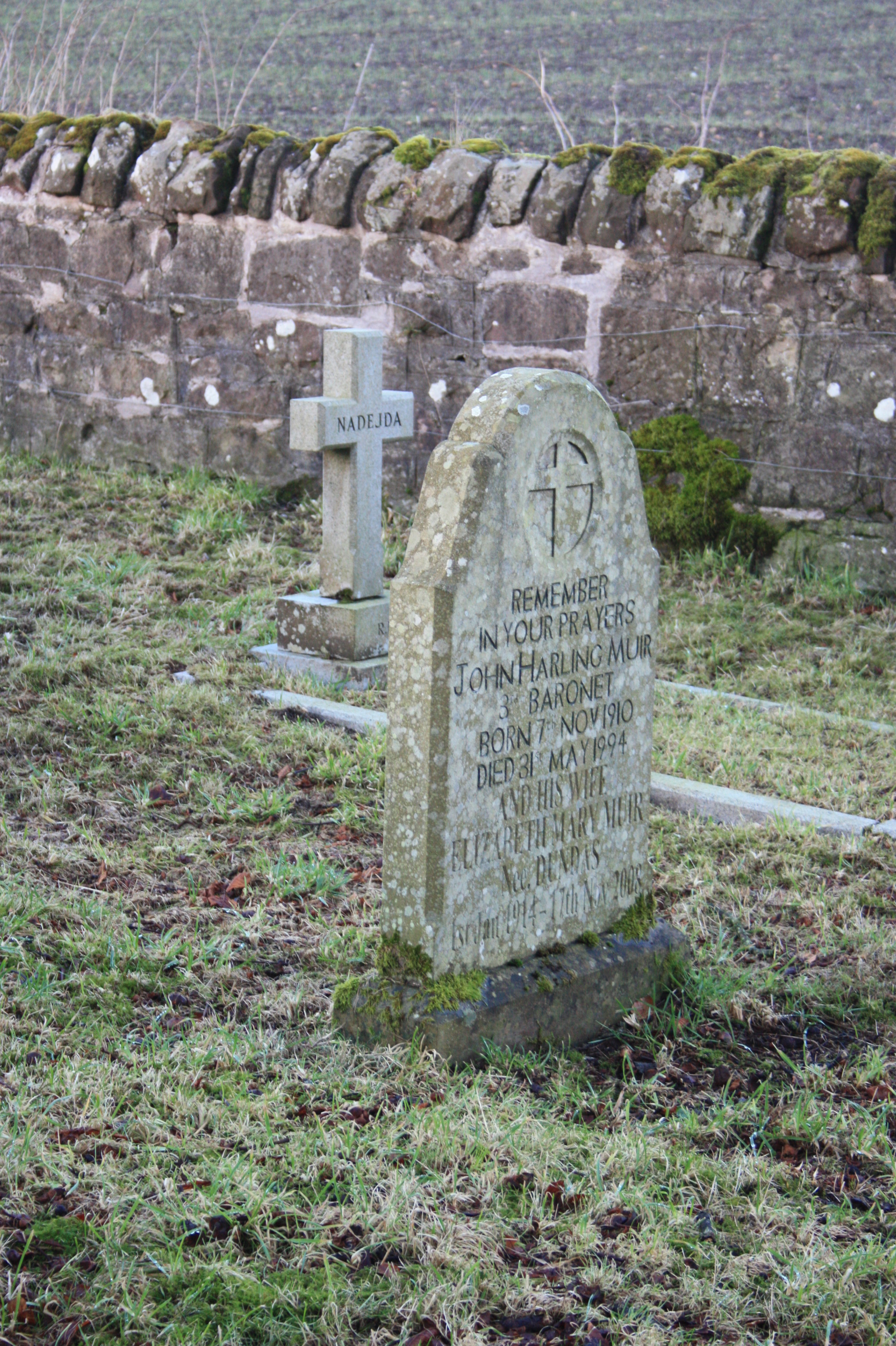
The grave of Sir John Harling Muir, Kincardine-in-Menteith

- Sir John Muir, 1st Baronet (1828–1903) Lord Provost of Glasgow
- Sir Alexander Kay Muir, 2nd Baronet (1868–1951)
- Sir John Harling Muir, 3rd Baronet (1910–1994)
- Richard James Kay Muir, presumed 4th Baronet (1939–2023)
- Ian Charles Muir, 5th Baronet (born 1940)

The heir presumptive is the present holder's brother Andrew Hugh John Muir (born 1943).

The family are buried at Kincardine-in-Menteith on the road from Deanston to Stirling, just west of Blair Drummond.

Baronetage of the United Kingdom
Preceded by Armstrong baronets	Muir baronets of Deanston and Park Gardens; 20 October 1892	Succeeded by Farquhar baronets
