= 1890 North Kilkenny by-election =

UK parliamentary by-election

The 1890 North Kilkenny by-election was a parliamentary by-election held for the United Kingdom House of Commons constituency of North Kilkenny on 22 December 1890. It arose as a result of the death of the sitting member, Edward Marum of the Irish Parliamentary Party.

== Background ==
In the period immediately before the by-election, the Irish Parliamentary Party entered a serious crisis. Its leader, Charles Stewart Parnell, had just been cited as co-respondent in a divorce case, which he had not contested, causing a scandal. A heated discussion in a committee room in Westminster showed many of the party MPs were opposed to Parnell continuing as leader; shortly afterwards, a majority left to found a new Anti-Parnellite group. The by-election in North Kilkenny was the first opportunity to test the support for the two sides among Irish voters, who up to that point had been firmly united behind the Irish Parliamentary Party. The contest at North Kilkenny would turn out to be the first of three by-elections, representing, as Frank Callanan puts it, 'a staggered plebiscite on [Parnell's] leadership'.

== Campaign ==
The candidate chosen to replace Marum was Sir John Pope Hennessy, a former colonial administrator who had been a Conservative MP for King's County, twenty years earlier. Hennessy at first expressed his support for Parnell. However, once the party at Westminster had split and Parnell had lost the support of the Catholic Bishops, he announced he would 'act with the majority of the Irish party and the support of the Irish prelates'. The Parnellites then selected Vincent Scully, a Tipperary landlord, as their candidate.

For the campaign, the main objective of the Anti-Parnellites was to focus attention on the divorce issue and away from Parnell's appeal to national patriotism. They turned to ridicule to break the effect of their former leader's celebrated mystique. The main figure behind their campaign was Michael Davitt, who masterminded an intensive campaign that divided the constituency into 18 polling districts, sending MPs and priests to each to spread the message. A group of activists led by Davitt pursued Parnell on his canvass, confronting and harassing him. There was violence at some points, with Davitt being assaulted and Parnell having what he said was quicklime thrown in his eye.

Early in the campaign there was considerable expectation that Parnell would succeed, but as time went on this view faded. Observers noted that while Parnell had the support of the business community and large farmers (as well as the landless labourers, who did not have a vote), the middle and small farmers generally opposed him. For the Parnellites, one major factor acting against them was the Church, with priests allowing after-Mass meetings and speaking on Anti-Parnellite platforms, although fear of an election petition prevented more active support. The only area where Parnell won a majority was the one where the local Parish priest supported him.

== Voting ==
Although there were 5,700 voters on the register, it was calculated that only about 4,600 were available on the day. Given the generally hostile attitude of the Catholic Church to Parnell's supporters, it was noted that the Anti-Parnellite, Hennessy, had a number of priests supporting him as personation agents in the polling booths, and others were seen outside the booths. Matters were sometimes tense:

'In the course of the day, at the polling booth for the district of Grace's Oldcastle, a clergyman asked for the assistance of the police, as one of the crowd, he stated, had just struck a voter who was about to enter the booth. The clergyman was at once surrounded by an excited crowd, who closed round him crying, "Liar", "It's a lie," and, but for the interference of Dr Hackett, a Parnellite, events might have taken an unpleasant turn.'

As the votes were counted, it quickly became clear that Scully would lose, with estimates of the Anti-Parnellite majority ranging from around 500 to 1,200. The final result was near the top of the scale - Hennessy won 2,527 votes to Scully's 1,365 - a majority of 1,162.

== Result ==
1890 North Kilkenny by-election
Party	Candidate	Votes	%	±%
Irish Parliamentary	John Pope Hennessy	2,527	65.0	N/A
Irish National League	Vincent Scully	1,365	35.1	N/A
Majority		1,162	29.9	N/A
Turnout		3,889	68.5	N/A
Registered electors		5,675		
Irish Parliamentary hold		Swing	N/A	

== Aftermath ==
The result at North Kilkenny was a disaster for the Parnellite movement, not only because it showed strong public support for his opponents, but also because his behaviour - his speeches were seen as poor, self-pitying and ill-tempered, in comparison to his normal eloquence and reserve - undermined his political image. A major element in his success was the mystique of electoral invincibility, and that was now shattered.
