= Armstrong baronets of Ashburn Place (1892) =

Escutcheon of the Armstrong baronets of Ashburn Place

The Armstrong baronetcy, of Ashburn Place in the County of London, was created on 19 October 1892 for George Armstrong, owner of The Globe newspaper.

The title became extinct on the death of the 3rd Baronet in 1944.

== Armstrong baronets, of Ashburn Place (1892) ==
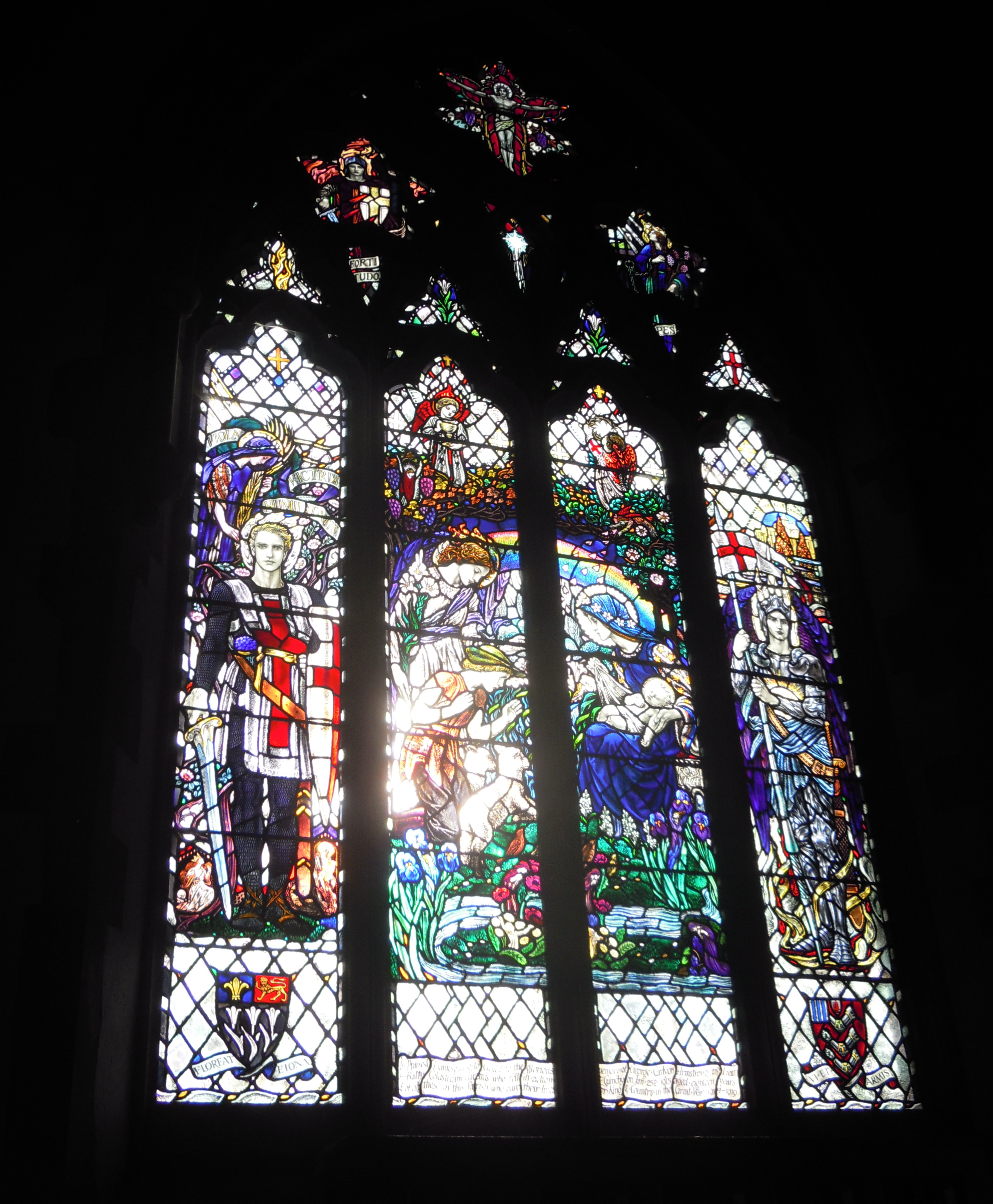
Armstrong Window, Church of James the Less, Pangbourne, erected by the 2nd Baronet and his wife in memory of their son and a nephew who died in World War I, with arms of Armstrong (right) and Eton College

- Sir George Carlyon Hughes Armstrong, 1st Baronet (1836–1907)
- Sir George Elliot Armstrong, 2nd Baronet (1866–1940)
- Sir Francis Philip Armstrong, 3rd Baronet (1871–1944)

== Notes ==
Baronetage of the United Kingdom
Preceded by Morgan baronets	Armstrong baronets of Ashburn Place; 19 October 1892	Succeeded by Muir baronets
