= King's County Birr =

Former parliamentary constituency in the United Kingdom

- Former county constituency for the House of Commons

1885–1918
- Seats: 1
- Created from: King's County
- Replaced by: King's County

Birr, a division of King's County, was a constituency in Ireland, returning one Member of Parliament to the United Kingdom House of Commons from 1885 to 1918.

Prior to the 1885 United Kingdom general election and after the dissolution of Parliament in 1918 the area was part of the King's County constituency.

== Boundaries ==
This constituency comprised the south-western part of King's County now known as County Offaly. It consisted of the baronies of Ballycowan, Ballyboy and Eglish, Ballybritt, Clonlisk and Garrycastle.

== Members of Parliament ==
Election	Member	Party
1885	Bernard Charles Molloy	Irish Parliamentary Party
1892	Bernard Charles Molloy	Anti-Parnellite Nationalist
1900	Michael Reddy	Irish Parliamentary Party
1918	Constituency merged into King's County	

== Elections ==
=== Elections in the 1880s ===
1885 general election: Birr
Party	Candidate	Votes	%	±%
Irish Parliamentary	Bernard Charles Molloy	3,408	81.8	
Irish Conservative	Thomas Scroope Wellesley Bernard	760	18.2	
Majority		2,648	63.6	
Turnout		4,168	79.6	
Registered electors		5,236		
Irish Parliamentary win (new seat)				

1886 general election: Birr
Party	Candidate	Votes	%	±%
Irish Parliamentary	Bernard Charles Molloy	3,266	82.1	+0.3
Irish Conservative	Thomas Scroope Wellesley Bernard	711	17.9	−0.3
Majority		2,555	64.2	+0.6
Turnout		3,977	76.0	−3.6
Registered electors		5,236		
Irish Parliamentary hold		Swing		

=== Elections in the 1890s ===
1892 general election: Birr
Party	Candidate	Votes	%	±%
Irish National Federation	Bernard Charles Molloy	3,279	83.0	+0.9
Irish Unionist	William Thomas Trench	670	17.0	−0.9
Majority		2,609	66.0	N/A
Turnout		3,949	75.2	−0.8
Registered electors		5,253		
Irish National Federation gain from Irish Parliamentary		Swing	+0.9	

1895 general election: Birr
Party	Candidate	Votes	%	±%
Irish National Federation	Bernard Charles Molloy	Unopposed		
Registered electors		5,003		
Irish National Federation hold				

=== Elections in the 1900s ===
1900 general election: Birr
Party	Candidate	Votes	%	±%
Irish Parliamentary	Michael Reddy	1,451	55.1	N/A
Healyite Nationalist	Bernard Charles Molloy	1,181	44.9	N/A
Majority		270	10.2	N/A
Turnout		2,632	54.9	N/A
Registered electors		4,792		
Irish Parliamentary hold		Swing	N/A	

1906 general election: Birr
Party	Candidate	Votes	%	±%
Irish Parliamentary	Michael Reddy	Unopposed		
Registered electors		4,512		
Irish Parliamentary hold				

=== Elections in the 1910s ===
January 1910 general election: Birr
Party	Candidate	Votes	%	±%
Irish Parliamentary	Michael Reddy	Unopposed		
Registered electors		4,410		
Irish Parliamentary hold				

December 1910 general election: Birr
Party	Candidate	Votes	%	±%
Irish Parliamentary	Michael Reddy	2,123	77.3	N/A
Ind. Nationalist	Frederick Ryan	624	22.7	New
Majority		1,499	54.6	N/A
Turnout		2,747	62.3	N/A
Registered electors		4,410		
Irish Parliamentary hold		Swing	N/A	
