= David Sherlock (MP) =

Irish politician, barrister and Law Officer

David Sherlock MP QC

Member of Parliament for King's County
- In office 17 November 1868 – 31 March 1880 Serving with Patrick O'Brien
- Preceded by: Patrick O'Brien; John Gilbert King
- Succeeded by: Patrick O'Brien; Bernard Charles Molloy

Personal details
- Born: 1814 Dundrum, Dublin
- Died: 16 April 1884 (aged 69–70) Stillorgan
- Party: Home Rule League
- Other political affiliations: Liberal (until 1874)
- Children: Thomas Thierri Sherlock David Sherlock, others

David Sherlock QC (1814 – 16 April 1884) was an Irish Liberal Party and Home Rule League politician. He was also a successful barrister and Law Officer.

He was the eldest son of Thomas Sherlock of Dundrum, Dublin and Isabella Ball, daughter of John Ball, a wealthy silk mercer, and his second wife Mabel Clare Bennett of Eyrecourt, County Galway, and sister of Nicholas Ball, judge of the Court of Common Pleas (Ireland).

The Sherlock family had been settled in Dundrum for some generations. They had previously held substantial lands in County Kildare, at Littlerath and Derrindaragh, from the time of Henry VII until after the Glorious Revolution. His ancestor, the wealthy merchant Christopher Sherlock, sat in the Irish House of Commons as MP for Naas in three Parliaments between 1613 and 1642. Christopher's eldest son Sir John Sherlock (1603–1652) was knighted in 1635, sat in the Irish House of Commons as MP for Dublin from 1642, and was a gentleman of the Privy Chamber.

David was first elected as one of the two Members of Parliament (MPs) for King's County in 1868 as a Liberal politician, before standing successfully as a Home Rule candidate in 1874.

He was called to the Bar in 1837, became QC in 1855 and was appointed Serjeant-at-law (Ireland). He became Third Serjeant in 1870, Second Serjeant in 1877 and First Serjeant in 1880. He was First Serjeant until his death. He also served as a part-time judge on the North Western circuit. He was senior Crown prosecutor for Leinster at the time of his death.

He lived at Stillorgan Castle, County Dublin. He married Elizabeth Thierri, daughter of John Thierri, chairman of the Board of Customs and Excise, and had six children, including Thomas Thierri Sherlock (1844–1905), the eldest son and heir, and David Sherlock (1850–1940), the noted peat industrialist.

Parliament of the United Kingdom
Preceded by Patrick O'Brien; John Gilbert King	Member of Parliament for King's County; 1868 – 1880; With: Patrick O'Brien	Succeeded by Patrick O'Brien; Bernard Charles Molloy
