= North Kilkenny =

UK Parliament constituency in Ireland, 1885–1922

- Former county constituency for the House of Commons
- County: County Kilkenny

1885–1922
- Seats: 1
- Created from: County Kilkenny
- Replaced by: Carlow–Kilkenny

North Kilkenny was a parliamentary constituency in Ireland, represented in the House of Commons of the Parliament of the United Kingdom. It returned one Member of Parliament (MP) from 1885 to 1922.

== History ==
From 1801 to 1885, County Kilkenny returned two MPs to the House of Commons of the United Kingdom sitting at the Palace of Westminster, with separate representation for the parliamentary borough of Kilkenny City.

Under the Redistribution of Seats Act 1885, County Kilkenny was divided into two divisions: North Down and South Kilkenny, with Kilkenny City maintaining its separate representation. Under the Redistribution of Seats (Ireland) Act 1918, Kilkenny City ceased to exist as a parliamentary borough. This followed a boundary commission report. Sinn Féin contested the 1918 general election on an abstentionist platform in its election manifesto pledging that instead of taking up any seats at Westminster, they would establish an assembly in Dublin. All MPs elected to Irish seats were invited to participate in the First Dáil convened in January 1919, but no members outside of Sinn Féin did so.

1885–1918: The baronies of Crannagh, Fassadinin, Galmoy and Shillelogher, and that part of the barony of Gowran not contained within the South Kilkenny constituency.

1918–1922: The rural districts of Castecomer, Kilkenny and Urlingford No. 1, and the urban district of Kilkenny.

The constituency ceased to be entitled to be represented in the UK House of Commons on the dissolution of 26 October 1922, shortly before the Irish Free State came into existence on 6 December 1922.

== First Dáil ==
The constituency was, in Irish republican theory, entitled to return one TD (known in English as a Deputy) in 1918 to serve in the Irish Republic's First Dáil. Sinn Féin used the UK general election in 1918 to elect the Dáil. The revolutionary body assembled on 21 January 1919. The list of members read out on that day included everyone elected in Ireland. Only the Sinn Féin Deputies participated in the Dáil, but the other Irish MPs could have done so if they had chosen to adhere to the Republic.

The First Dáil, passed a motion at its last meeting on 10 May 1921, the first three parts of which make explicit the republican view.

1. That the Parliamentary elections which are to take place during the present month be regarded as elections to Dáil Éireann.
2. That all deputies duly returned at these elections be regarded as members of Dáil Éireann and allowed to take their seats on subscribing to the proposed Oath of Allegiance.
3. That the present Dáil dissolve automatically as soon as the new body has been summoned by the President and called to order.

The Second Dáil first met on 16 August 1921, thereby dissolving the First Dáil.

Sinn Féin had decided to use the polls for the Northern Ireland House of Commons and the House of Commons of Southern Ireland as an election for the Irish Republic's Second Dáil. No actual voting was necessary in Southern Ireland as all the seats were filled by unopposed returns. Except for Dublin University all other constituencies elected Sinn Féin TDs. As with the First Dáil, the other Deputies could have joined the Dáil if they chose.

From the 3rd Dáil onwards the Dáil represented only the twenty-six counties which formed the Irish Free State.

In the 2nd and 3rd Dála Kilkenny North formed part of the Carlow–Kilkenny constituency.

== Politics ==
The constituency was a safe nationalist/republican seat throughout its existence, from 1885 to 1922. Only three of the thirteen elections held in the seat (nine at general elections and four at by-elections) were contested. All elections in the constituency after its first decade of existence, starting with the 1895 general election, were uncontested.

A Conservative in 1885 (who polled only 174 votes) and a Unionist in 1892 (who received a not much larger 314 votes), were the only candidates from other political traditions to contest the seat.

The most hotly contested election was the 1890 North Kilkenny by-election. This was the first parliamentary election to take place in Ireland after the Irish Parliamentary Party split into Parnellite and Anti-Parnellite factions, in early December 1890. The two factions each nominated a candidate. The Anti-Parnellite won, on a 2,527 to 1,362 vote.

The Sinn Féin candidate, future President of the Executive Council of the Irish Free State W. T. Cosgrave, made an unopposed gain from the IPP in 1918.

== Members of Parliament ==
Election	Member	Party	Note
3 December 1885	Edward Marum	Irish Parliamentary	Died 21 September 1890
22 December 1890	Sir John Pope-Hennessy	Anti-Parnellite	Joined new organisation
March 1891^{1}	Sir John Pope-Hennessy	Irish National Federation	Died 7 October 1891
29 October 1891	Patrick McDermott	Irish National Federation	Re-elected as a candidate of the IPP
10 October 1900	Patrick McDermott	Irish Parliamentary	Resigned
26 February 1902	Joseph Devlin	Irish Parliamentary	1906: Chose to represent Belfast West
3 March 1906	Michael Meagher	Irish Parliamentary	
14 December 1918 ^{2}	W. T. Cosgrave	Sinn Féin	Did not take his seat at Westminster
26 October 1922	UK constituency abolished		

Notes:-

- ^{1} Not an election, but the date of a party change. The Irish Parliamentary Party had been created in 1882, on the initiative of Charles Stewart Parnell's Irish National League. Both the IPP and the INL split into Parnellite and Anti-Parnellite factions, in December 1890. The Parnellites remained members of the Irish National League after the split and the Anti-Parnellites organised the Irish National Federation in March 1891. The two organisations and the United Irish League merged in 1900, to re-create the Irish Parliamentary Party.
- ^{2} Date of polling day. The result was declared on 28 December 1918, to allow time for votes cast by members of the armed forces to be included in the count (in contested seats).

== Elections ==
=== Elections in the 1880s ===
1885 general election: North Kilkenny
Party	Candidate	Votes	%	±%
Irish Parliamentary	Edward Marum	4,084	95.9	
Irish Conservative	Charles Bellew	174	4.1	
Majority		3,910	91.8	
Turnout		4,258	75.4	
Registered electors		5,647		
Irish Parliamentary win (new seat)				

1886 general election: North Kilkenny
Party	Candidate	Votes	%	±%
Irish Parliamentary	Edward Marum	Unopposed		
Irish Parliamentary hold				

=== Elections in the 1890s ===
1890 North Kilkenny by-election
Party	Candidate	Votes	%	±%
Irish Parliamentary	John Pope Hennessy	2,527	65.0	N/A
Irish National League	Vincent Scully	1,365	35.1	N/A
Majority		1,162	29.9	N/A
Turnout		3,889	68.5	N/A
Registered electors		5,675		
Irish Parliamentary hold		Swing	N/A	

1891 North Kilkenny by-election
Party	Candidate	Votes	%	±%
Irish National Federation	Patrick McDermott	Unopposed		
Irish National Federation gain from Irish Parliamentary				

1892 general election: North Kilkenny
Party	Candidate	Votes	%	±%
Irish National Federation	Patrick McDermott	2,898	90.2	N/A
Irish Unionist	Walter McMurrough Kavanagh	314	9.8	New
Majority		2,584	80.4	N/A
Turnout		3,212	54.6	N/A
Registered electors		5,879		
Irish National Federation hold		Swing	N/A	

1895 general election: North Kilkenny
Party	Candidate	Votes	%	±%
Irish National Federation	Patrick McDermott	Unopposed		
Irish National Federation hold				

=== Elections in the 1900s ===
1900 general election: North Kilkenny
Party	Candidate	Votes	%	±%
Irish Parliamentary	Patrick McDermott	Unopposed		
Irish Parliamentary hold				

North Kilkenny by-election 1902
Party	Candidate	Votes	%	±%
Irish Parliamentary	Joseph Devlin	Unopposed		
Irish Parliamentary hold				

1906 general election: North Kilkenny
Party	Candidate	Votes	%	±%
Irish Parliamentary	Joseph Devlin	Unopposed		
Irish Parliamentary hold				

Devlin was also elected as MP for Belfast West and instead opted to sit as an MP there, prompting a by-election.

North Kilkenny by-election 1906
Party	Candidate	Votes	%	±%
Irish Parliamentary	Michael Meagher	Unopposed		
Irish Parliamentary hold				

=== Elections in the 1910s ===
January 1910 general election: North Kilkenny
Party	Candidate	Votes	%	±%
Irish Parliamentary	Michael Meagher	Unopposed		
Irish Parliamentary hold				

December 1910 general election: North Kilkenny
Party	Candidate	Votes	%	±%
Irish Parliamentary	Michael Meagher	Unopposed		
Irish Parliamentary hold				

1918 general election: North Kilkenny
Party	Candidate	Votes	%	±%
Sinn Féin	W. T. Cosgrave	Unopposed		
Sinn Féin gain from Irish Parliamentary				
