= George Carlyon Hughes Armstrong =

English journalist and newspaper proprietor

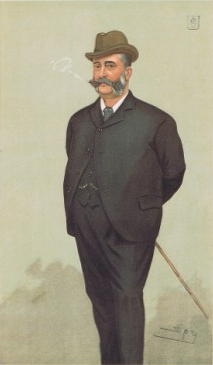
George Carlyon Hughes Armstrong, 1894 caricature

Sir George Carlyon Hughes Armstrong, 1st Baronet (1836–1907) was an English journalist and newspaper proprietor.

== Biography ==
The younger son of Colonel George Craven Armstrong, of the East India Company's army, and of Georgianna, daughter of Captain Philip Hughes, he was born at Lucknow, India on 20 July 1836. He was privately educated and was nominated to a military cadetship in the company's service in the year 1855. During the Indian Mutiny he was attached to the 59th Bengal native infantry, and afterwards to Stokes's Pathan horse, a newly raised regiment of native irregulars. As second in command of the latter he was dangerously wounded in the course of the operations around Delhi. On the suppression of the mutiny he was appointed orderly officer at Addiscombe Military College, a post which he occupied till the closing of that institution in 1861, when he retired from the army with the rank of captain.

In 1866, Armstrong took up the duties of secretary and registration agent to the Westminster Conservative Association, and his efforts were largely responsible for the electoral defeat of John Stuart Mill by W. H. Smith in November 1868. After acting for a short time as financial manager of Watney's brewery, he was offered in 1871 the editorship and management of The Globe newspaper, then in the hands of a Conservative syndicate led by George Cubitt. The paper was losing money, but Armstrong, without previous experience of journalism, transformed it into a valuable property, and made it an influential supporter of Benjamin Disraeli in the London press. The Globe was made over to him by the owners in 1875, and in 1882 he acquired a major interest in The People, a Sunday conservative paper with a large circulation.

Armstrong acquired a handsome fortune, but he took no part in public or political affairs outside the columns of his paper. Perhaps the best remembered incident in connection with his editorship of the Globe was the disclosure in its pages, on 30 May 1878, of the terms of the Salisbury-Schouvaloff Treaty. A summary of that document had been brought to the paper by an occasional contributor, Charles Marvin, to whom the foreign office had given employment as an emergency "writer". The official denial of its correctness was followed by the publication in the same paper on 14 June of the full text. Proceedings were instituted against Marvin by the government, but were then dropped.

In 1892 Armstrong received a baronetcy in recognition of his services to the Unionist party; he had given the editorship of the Globe in 1889, and in 1899 the control of the paper passed to George Elliot Armstrong, his second surviving son, who succeeded to the baronetcy. He died on 20 April 1907, after a long illness, and was buried at Woking.

== Personal life ==
Armstrong married on 2 February 1865 Alice Fitzroy, daughter of the Rev. Charles Joseph Furlong, who survived him. His eldest son, Arthur Reginald, lieutenant 19th Hussars, died at Secunderabad 1 November 1898. A portrait in oils by Herkomer belongs to his widow. A cartoon portrait by "Spy" appeared in Vanity Fair in 1894.

== Arms ==
Coat of arms of George Carlyon Hughes Armstrong

Notes
Confirmed 1 October 1892 by Henry Farnham Burke, Deputy Ulster King of Arms.
Crest
In front of an arm as in the arms a trefoil slipped Vert.
Escutcheon
Gules three dexter arms in armour couped at the shoulder embowed and bendwise in pale Proper garnished Or fists clenched of the second on a canton argent three pallets Azure.

Baronetage of the United Kingdom
New creation	Baronet (of Ashburn Place); 1892–1907	Succeeded by George Elliot Armstrong
