= Sir Patrick O'Brien, 2nd Baronet =

Irish politician

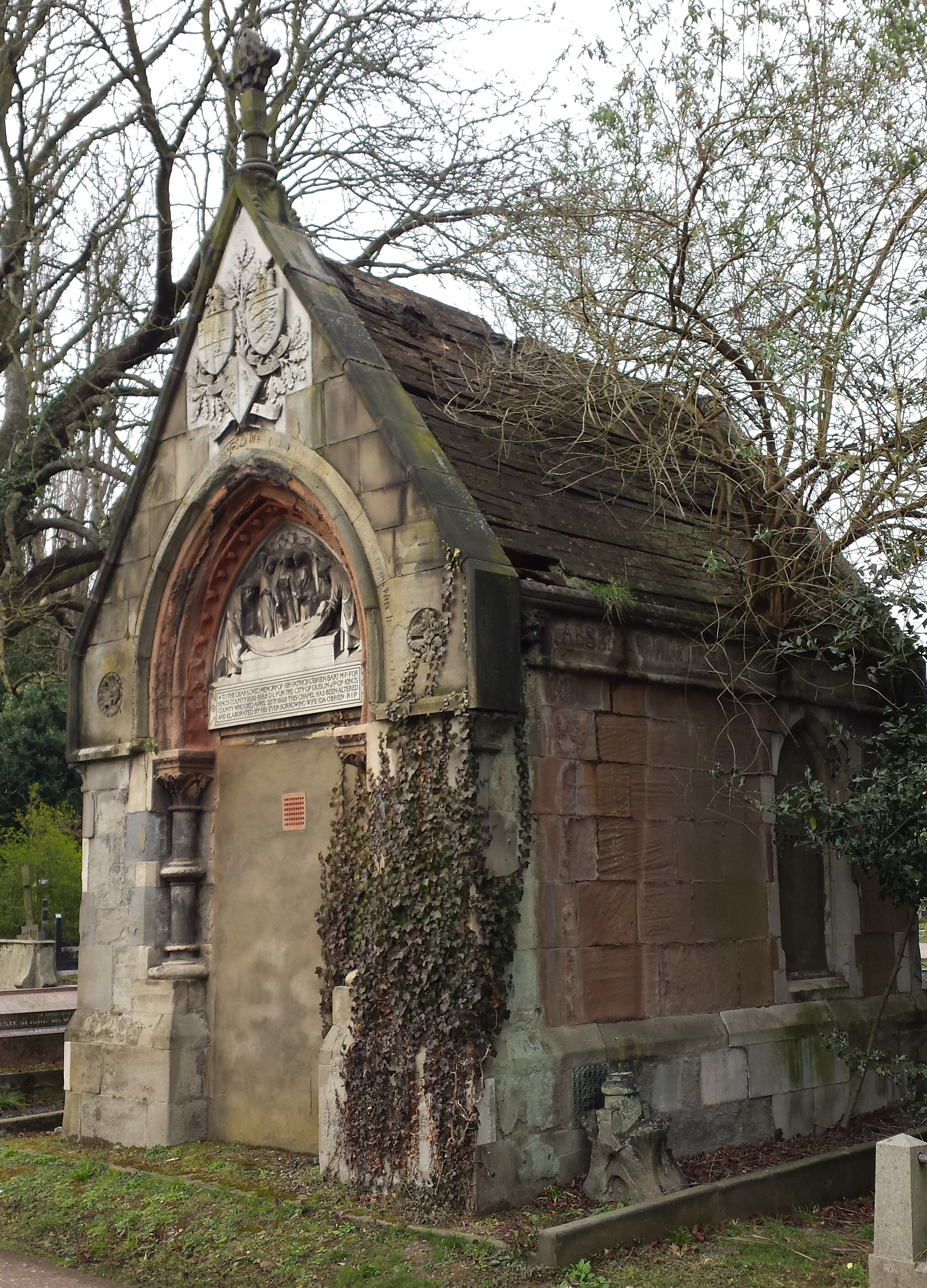
Vault of Sir Patrick O'Brien, 2nd Baronet of Merrion Square and Boris-in-Ossory, Kensal Green

Sir Patrick O'Brien, 2nd Baronet (1823 – 26 April 1895) was an Irish politician.

He was elected in 1852 as a member of parliament for King's County (now County Offaly), and held the seat until the constituency was divided at the 1885 general election. He was buried at Kensal Green Cemetery

Parliament of the United Kingdom
Preceded by John Westenra; Sir Andrew Armstrong	Member of Parliament for King's County; 1852 – 1885; With: Loftus Henry Bland 1852–59; John Pope Hennessy 1859–65; John Gilbert King 1865–68; David Sherlock 1868–80; Bernard Molloy 1880–15	Constituency divided
Regnal titles
Preceded by Timothy O'Brien	Baronet (of Merrion Square and Boris-in-Ossory); 1862–1895	Succeeded by Tim O'Brien
