= Andy Armstrong =

Andy Armstrong may refer to:

- Andy Armstrong (cricketer), English cricketer
- Andy Armstrong (born 1953), writer/director of Moonshine Highway

== See also ==
- Andrew Armstrong (disambiguation)
