= John Westenra =

Irish Whig politician and army officer

Member of Parliament for King's County
- In office 16 January 1835 – 26 July 1852 Serving with Nicholas Fitzsimon (1835–1841); Andrew Armstrong (1841–1852)
- Preceded by: William Parsons; Nicholas Fitzsimon
- Succeeded by: Patrick O'Brien; Loftus Henry Bland

Personal details
- Born: 31 March 1798 Walsh Park, County Tipperary, Ireland
- Died: 5 December 1874 (aged 76)
- Party: Whig
- Parent(s): Warner Westenra, 2nd Baron Rossmore; Mary Anne Walsh

John Craven Westenra (31 March 1798 – 5 December 1874) was an Irish Whig politician and army officer.

Born in Walsh Park, County Tipperary, Ireland, he was the son of Warner Westenra, 2nd Baron Rossmore and Mary Ann Walsh, and the brother of Henry Westenra, 3rd Baron Rossmore. He first married Eleanor Mary East née Jolliffe, daughter of William Jolliffe, in 1834. After she died in 1838, he then married Ann Daubuz, daughter of Lewis Charles Daubuz, in 1842, and they had at least one /child: Mary Anne Wilmot Westenra (died 1894; wife of Francis Power Plantagenet Hastings, 14th Earl of Huntingdon).

An army officer, he at sometime achieved the rank of Lieutenant-Colonel in the Scots Fusilier Guards.

Westenra was first elected Whig MP for King's County at the 1835 general election and held the seat until 1852, when he did not seek re-election.

He was also a member of the Reform Club and, in 1863, held the office of High Sheriff of King's County.

Parliament of the United Kingdom
Preceded by William Parsons; Nicholas Fitzsimon	Member of Parliament for King's County; 1835–1852; With: Nicholas Fitzsimon (1835–1841); Andrew Armstrong (1841–1852)	Succeeded by Patrick O'Brien; Loftus Henry Bland
