= Kinnitty Castle =

19th century castle in County Offaly, Ireland

Coordinates: 53°06′N 7°42′W

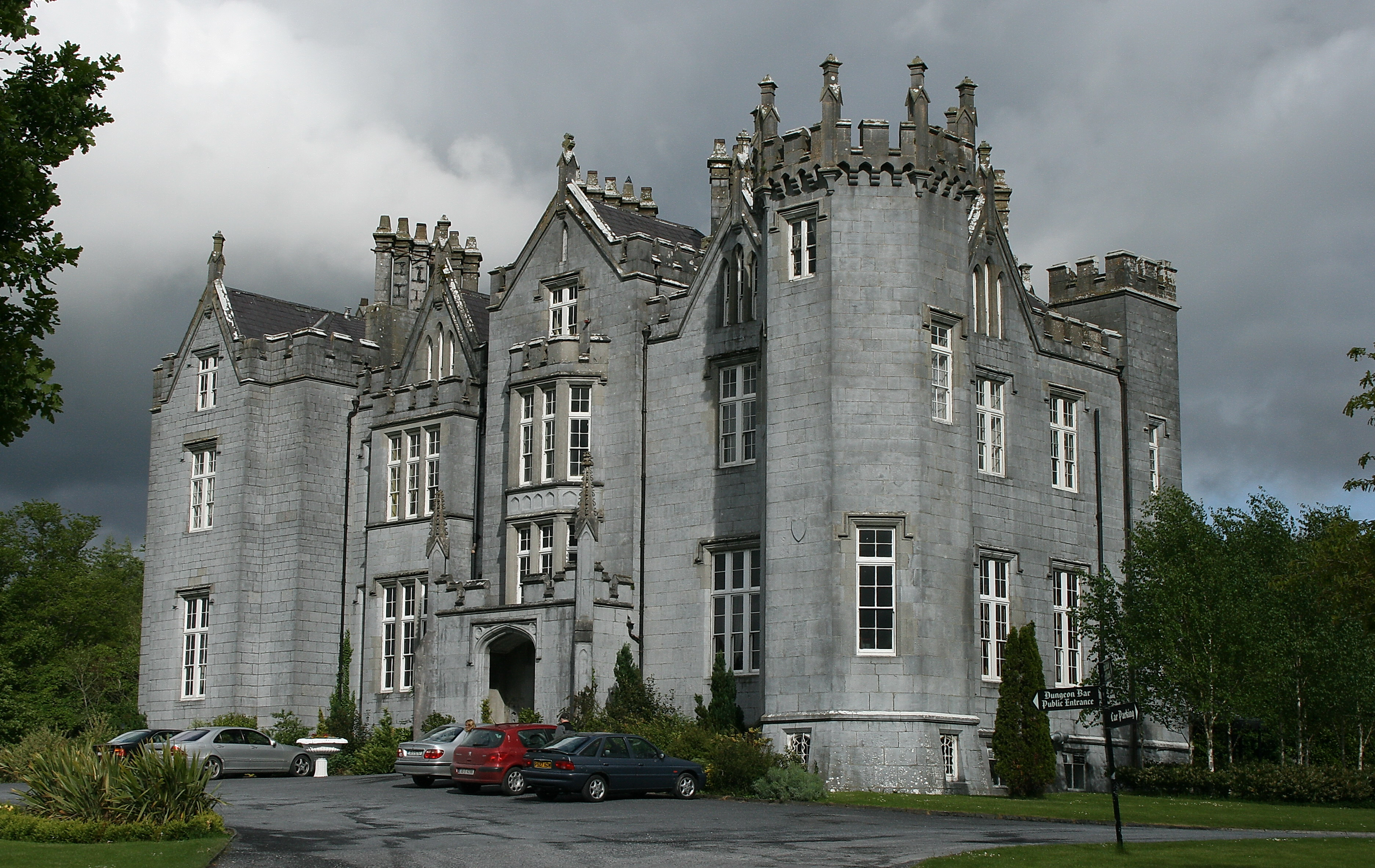
Kinnitty Castle

Kinnitty Castle or Castle Bernard is a 19th-century gothic revival castle and hotel in Kinnitty (Cionn Eitigh), County Offaly, Ireland. It is located contiguous to Droughtville and Lettybrook, north of the Slieve Bloom Mountains on the R421 regional road between the villages of Kinnitty and Cadamstown. A nearby pyramid was built by the Bernard family who resided in the castle.

== History ==
The first castle at Kinnitty was destroyed in 1209 and was rebuilt by the Normans in 1213. During that period an Augustinian abbey was established near the castle, of which the Abbey Wall still remains. Later the Normans were replaced by the O'Carrolls of Ely and in 1630 William O'Carroll built a new castle close by the old abbey. This castle was confiscated in 1641 as part of the plantation of Offaly, or Kings County as it was then named. In 1664, the crown granted an estate, which included the castle, to Col. Thomas Winter in return for his military service. His descendants sold it to Thomas Bernard, who renamed the house Castle Bernard and left it to his son Thomas Bernard, MP. Several historic features of the original castle remain accessible to visitors.

In 1811, Lady Catherine Hutchinson, wife of Thomas, jr, commissioned architect James Pain to extend the castle in a Tudor revival style to its present size. Thomas was succeeded by his son, Colonel Thomas Bernard, Lord Lieutenant of King's County and High Sheriff of King's County for 1837, who died unmarried in 1882 and was succeeded by his niece's husband Captain Caulfield French. The latter was High Sheriff of King's County for 1887.

Although burned by the Irish Republican Army in 1922, the house was restored in 1928 by means of a Government grant of £32,000. The Bernard family lived there until 1946, when it was sold to Lord Decies, who in turn sold it to the state in 1951. From 1955 to 1985, the building hosted a Forestry Training College. It was then purchased in 1994 by the Ryan family of Limerick, who developed it into a 37 bedroom, 4 star hotel and wedding venue. The castle was seized by the KBC Bank in 2008, who continued to keep it running as a Hotel until 2015 when the Castle was bought over by its present owners. The current ownership group of Irish and American investors includes Derek Warfield, founding member of the musical group the Wolfe Tones, and Colin Breen, owner of Four Green Fields Pub in Tampa, Florida. Since the purchase in 2015, Kinnitty Castle Hotel has undergone significant renovations and continues to serve as a wedding and executive-level conference venue, as well as a 4 star hotel.

== Captain Bernard ==
Captain Richard Bernard who lived at the Castle was much loved by Augusta Magan. The Captain was involved in the 19th-century Crimean War and three years after his return from war married a widow, Ellen Georgiana Handcock of the old Athlone family in 1859. He died in 1877 aged 55 and was buried in the Egyptian style family mausoleum in the grounds of St. Finnian's church, Kinnitty.

== Notes and references ==
- "Kinnitty Castle history".
