= Nicholas Fitzsimon =

Irish politician

Nicholas Fitzsimon (1807 – 31 July 1849) was an Irish politician.

Born at Broughall Castle, Fitzsimon attended Trinity College Dublin. He lived at Castlewood in County Offaly, and worked as a distiller. He became a captain in the County Monaghan militia.

Fitzsimon stood at the 1832 UK general election in King's County and was elected for the Repeal Association. He held the seat at the 1835 and 1837 UK general elections, but resigned in 1840 by taking the Chiltern Hundreds.

In 1841, Fitzsimon was appointed as a magistrate in Dublin, and he was knighted later in the year. He became Inspector-General of Prisons in Ireland in 1848, but died the following year.

Parliament of the United Kingdom
Preceded by William Parsons; Thomas Bernard	Member of Parliament for King's County; 1832–1840; With: William Parsons (1832-1835); John Westenra (1835-1840)	Succeeded by Andrew Armstrong; John Westenra
