= Loftus Henry Bland =

Irish politician

Loftus Henry Bland QC

Member of Parliament for King's County
- In office 26 July 1852 – 19 May 1859 Serving with Patrick O'Brien
- Preceded by: John Westenra; Andrew Armstrong
- Succeeded by: Patrick O'Brien; John Pope Hennessy

Personal details
- Born: August 1805 Blandsfort House, Rahanavannagh, Queen's County, Ireland
- Died: 21 January 1872 (aged 66) Dublin, Ireland
- Party: Liberal/Whig
- Other political affiliations: Independent Irish
- Spouse(s): Annie Hackett (m. 1843) Charlotte Annesley (m. 1840; died 1842)
- Children: Four
- Parent(s): John Brand; Elizabeth Birch
- Education: Trinity College, Cambridge

Loftus Henry Bland QC (August 1805 – 21 January 1872) was an Irish Liberal, Whig and Independent Irish Party politician.

Born in Blandsfort House, Queen's County, Ireland, and the third son of John Bland and Elizabeth née Birch, daughter of Robert Birch, Bland was educated at Trinity College, Cambridge, where he graduated as a Bachelor of Arts in 1825, and a Master of Arts in 1829. He was called to the Irish Bar in 1829, becoming a member of the Queen's Counsel in 1854.

In 1840, he married Charlotte Elizabeth Grove Annesley, daughter of Arthur Grove Annesley and Elizabeth née Mahon, and they had at least one child: John Loftus Bland (1841–1908). After Charlotte's death in 1842, he remarried to Annie Jane Hackett, daughter of John Prendergast Hackett, in 1843, and they had at least three children: Thomas Dalrymple Bland (1846–1869); Elizabeth Emily Bland (died 1901); and Annie Sophia Alicia Bland.

He became an Independent Irish Party Member of Parliament (MP) for King's County at the 1852 general election and, becoming a Whig in 1857, held the seat until 1859, when he unsuccessfully stood as a Liberal.

In 1862, Bland became chairman of the County Cavan Quarter Sessions. He died in Dublin in 1872.

== Arms ==
Coat of arms of Loftus Henry Bland

Notes
Confirmed 15 September 1854 by Sir John Bernard Burke, Ulster King of Arms.
Crest
Out of a ducal coronet Or a lion's head Proper charged with a crescent Gules.
Escutcheon
Argent on a bend Sable three pheons Or in the sinister chief point a crescent Gules.
Motto
Quo Fata Vocant

Parliament of the United Kingdom
Preceded by John Westenra; Andrew Armstrong	Member of Parliament for King's County; 1852–1859; With: Patrick O'Brien	Succeeded by Patrick O'Brien; John Pope Hennessy
