= Sir Francis Lumm, 1st Baronet =

Anglo-Irish baronet

Sir Francis Lumm, 1st Baronet (1733 − 1796 or 1797) was an Anglo-Irish baronet.

Lumm was the son of Francis Lumm and Sarah Heaton. In 1755 he served as High Sheriff of King's County. In 1762 he was appointed Governor of Ross Castle in County Kerry. On 24 February 1775 he was made a baronet, of Lumville in the Baronetage of Ireland.

He married an heiress, Miss Foster, but died without a male heir, at which point his title of baronet became extinct. He was buried at St James's Church, Piccadilly.

Baronetage of Ireland
New creation	Baronet (of Lumville); 1775–1797	Extinct
