= Joseph Devlin =

Irish journalist and politician (1871–1934)

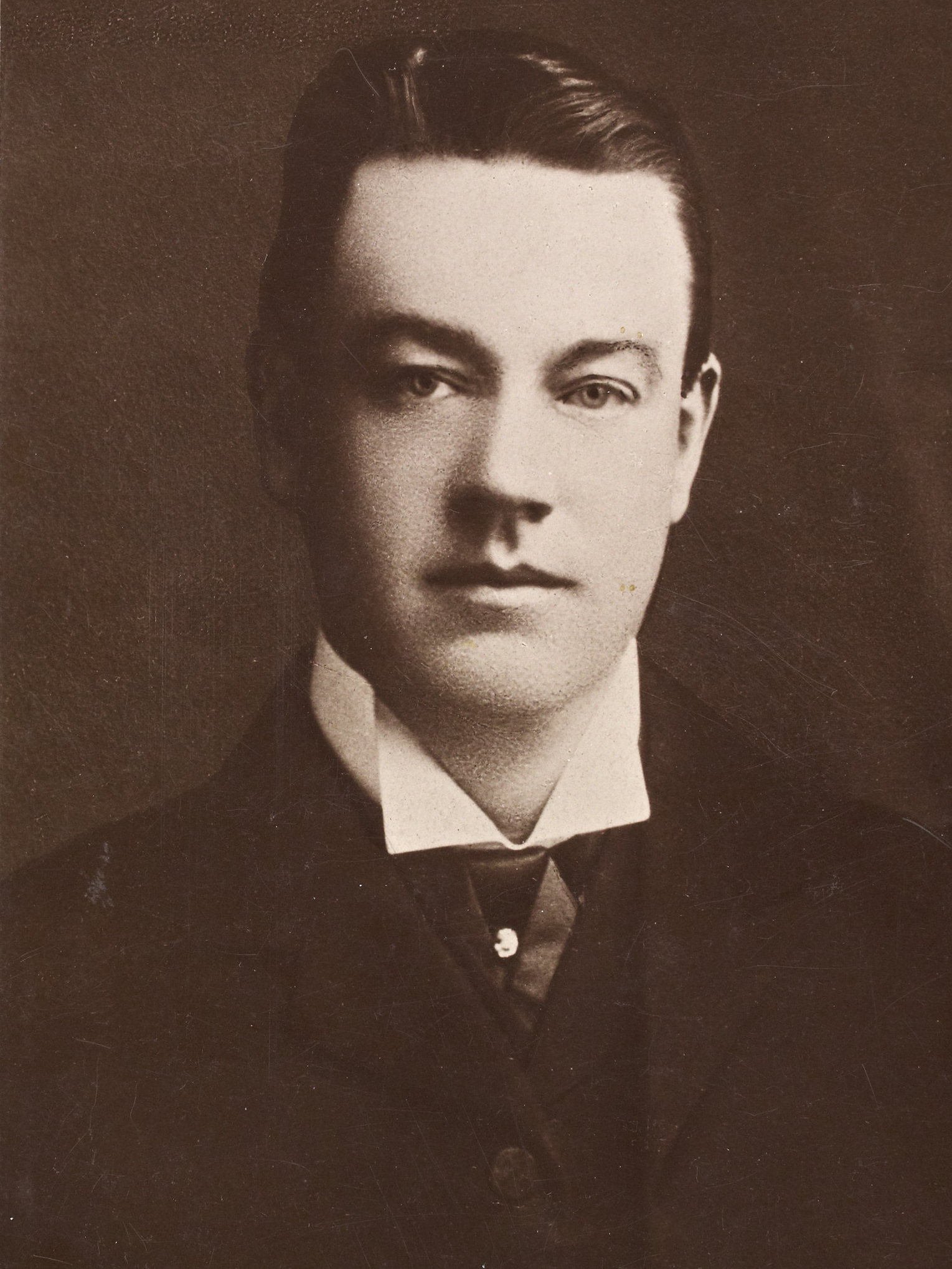
- Devlin, c. 1902

Member of the Northern Ireland Parliament for Belfast Central
- In office 1929–1934
- Preceded by: Seat created
- Succeeded by: Thomas Joseph Campbell

Member of the Northern Ireland Parliament for Belfast West
- In office 1921–1929
- Preceded by: Seat created
- Succeeded by: Seat abolished

Member of Parliament for Belfast Falls
- In office 1918–1922
- Preceded by: New constituency
- Succeeded by: Constituency abolished

Member of Parliament for Belfast West
- In office 1906–1918
- Preceded by: H. O. Arnold-Forster
- Succeeded by: Constituency abolished

Member of Parliament for North Kilkenny
- In office 1902–1906
- Preceded by: Patrick McDermott
- Succeeded by: Michael Meagher

Leader of the Nationalist Party
- In office 1921–1934
- Preceded by: Office established
- Succeeded by: Thomas Joseph Campbell

Leader of the Irish Parliamentary Party
- In office 1918–1921
- Preceded by: John Dillon

Personal details
- Born: 13 February 1871 Belfast, Ireland
- Died: 18 January 1934 (aged 62) Belfast, Northern Ireland
- Party: Nationalist Party
- Other political affiliations: Irish Parliamentary Party (until 1921)

Joseph Devlin (13 February 1871 – 18 January 1934) was an Irish journalist and influential nationalist politician. He was a Member of Parliament (MP) for the Irish Parliamentary Party in the House of Commons of the United Kingdom (1902–1922 and 1929–1934). Later Devlin was an MP and leader of the Nationalist Party in the Parliament of Northern Ireland. He was referred to as "the duodecimo Demosthenes" by the Irish politician Tim Healy which Devlin took as a compliment.

== Early years ==
Born at 10 Hamill Street in the Lower Falls area of Belfast, he was the fifth child of Charles Devlin (c.1839–1906), who was a self-employed 'jarvey', and his wife Elizabeth King (c.1841–1902), who sold groceries from their home; both were Catholics. Until he was twelve, he attended the nearby St. Mary's Christian Brothers' School in Divis Street, where he was educated in a more 'national' view of Irish history and culture than offered by the diocesan schools or the state system.

While working briefly as a clerk and in a pub, he showed an early gift for public speaking when he became chairman of a debating society founded in 1886 to commemorate the first Irish nationalist election victory in West Belfast. From 1891 to 1893 he was a journalist on the Irish News, then on the Freeman's Journal. He became associated with the Ancient Order of Hibernians (AOH), which he helped to establish in the 1890s. He became a lifelong opponent of its loyalist counterpart, the Orange Order. Devlin then worked at Samuel Young MP's brewery company, for which he was assistant manager of Kelly's Cellars, a Belfast pub, until 1902.

== Politician ==
During the 1890s he was active as organiser in the anti-Parnellite Irish National Federation in eastern Ulster. When William O'Brien founded the United Irish League (UIL) in County Mayo in 1898, Devlin founded the UIL section in Belfast which became his political machine in Ulster. He was elected unopposed as Irish Parliamentary Party (IPP) Member of Parliament for North Kilkenny in the February 1902 by-election. His first political assignment came that year when the Party sent him to Irish Americas on the first of several successful fund-raising missions. In his first four-month tour of the US, he addressed 160 meetings, raised £3,000 and established 184 branches of the United Irish League of America.

It was there that he encountered the power of the Hibernian Orders and on his return set about claiming it for constitutional nationalism, when in 1904 he became lifelong Grandmaster of the AOH in Ireland. Members of his Order, largely composed of earlier members of the Molly Maguires, a militant secret society also known as the Mollies, also became members of the Irish Party, deeply infiltrating it. Already secretary of the London-based United Irish League of Great Britain Devlin became General Secretary of O’Brien's UIL, replacing John O'Donnell, through the initiative of deputy IPP leader John Dillon MP, with whom he held a close alliance and who had fallen under his influence. This "coup" gave them nationwide control of the 1,200 UIL branches, the organisational base of the IPP, depriving O'Brien of all authority.

Devlin had risen in the ranks of the League from being a local Nationalist organiser in Belfast to becoming the only newcomer to the parliamentary party who was accepted politically, as an equal by the established leaders. He was devoted to Dillon who had helped him greatly to his rise to prominence, and Dillon in turn relied greatly on him, not alone for both his control of the UIL and the AOH, but also because he was an outstanding representative of Ulster Nationalism.

== Influence ==
He became a parliamentarian distinguished for his oratical and organisational skills, not merely as General Secretary of the United Irish League, but because he also dominated the Ancient Order of Hibernians. He was the only member of the younger generation to belong to the innermost circle of the IPP leadership and was widely seen as eventual heir-apparent.

For some years Devlin had been in bitter conflict with the bishops' Catholic Association who wanted politics based on Catholic rights rather than on nationalism. Now in control of the three nationalist political organisations all sides succumbed to Devlin's influence. The AOH continued the O'Connellite link between Catholicism and nationalism but under a lay controlled organisations. To the Irish party's opponents the AOH was synonymous with Catholic sectarianism, jobbery and patronage. Rivals such as Jim Larkin called it the "Ancient Order of Catholic Orangemen". Devlin represented the main urban and national business interests, which contrasted with his advocacy of social reforms when he took up labour issues especially working conditions in the linen mills and textile trades.

In the 1906 British general election, Devlin was re-elected to Kilkenny North, and also to Belfast West which he regained from the Unionists by 16 votes. Choosing to retain the Belfast seat, he served as its MP beyond 1918, when his popularity in Belfast and east Ulster survived the downfall of the IPP. Devlin became governor of the nationalist hinterland after his AOH political machinery rapidly saturated the country, acting through the UIL as the militant support organisation of the Irish Party. Devlin could assure John Redmond leader of the IPP, that at Redmond's bid, his organisation could provide full attendance of suitable "supporters" at any meeting, demonstration or convention throughout Ireland, something Redmond and his party often availed of.

The AOH was vehemently opposed by one nationalist organisation, the Munster based All-for-Ireland League (AFIL), an independent party founded by William O'Brien who held Devlin's AOH as being at the root of widespread religious intimidation and sectarianism. He and his followers were attacked at a UIL Convention in Dublin in February 1909 by 400 militant "Mollies" organised by Devlin to silence him and his followers at what became known as the "Baton Convention".

== Home Rule compromised ==
With the involvement of Ireland on the outbreak of World War I in August 1914, Devlin sided with Redmond's decision in supporting recruiting for Britain's and the Allied war effort and voluntary enlistment of National Volunteers in Irish regiments of the New Service Army. Redmond's plan was that, post-war, an intended 'Irish Brigade' and the National Volunteers would provide the basis for an Irish army, capable of enforcing Home Rule on reluctant Ulster Unionists. Devlin saw loyalty to the Empire as part of the deal for home rule. At a recruitment rally he said "We told the British people that if they gave Ireland that autonomy that inspired the loyalty of her colonies [...] Ireland would give the treasure of her blood and her allegiance to that Empire which, when it gives freedom constitutes itself the mightiest factor in the progress of human liberty". The Republican James Connolly wrote of the 'Wee Bottlewasher' as 'a recruiting sergeant luring to their deaths the men who trusted him and voted him into power.'

After the 1916 Easter Rising, Devlin compromised with Northern Nationalists on a temporary six-county exclusion to assist Lloyd George's abortive home rule negotiations, organising a convention which endorsed exclusion by a vote of 475 to 265. On the other hand, during the Irish Convention he sided with the bishops in blocking Redmond's compromise with Southern Unionists on Home Rule. In April 1918 Devlin was signatory to the anti- Conscription Crisis of 1918 pledge. At the end of the war he was elected Nationalist MP for Belfast Falls in the 1918 general election (in which he defeated Éamon de Valera of Sinn Féin), one of the very few Irish Parliamentary Party MPs to retain their seats against the Sinn Féin landslide.

== Minority leader ==
During 1919–1921, his leadership was reduced to six Nationalist MPs. His attempts to achieve a united nationalist front was undermined because of resentment by west Ulster nationalists of his acceptance of temporary partition as the price for a Home Rule settlement in 1916. He avoided any involvement in All-Ireland politics having accepted that the mandate had passed to Sinn Féin. Although, when he tried to bring up the Croke Park killings that occurred on Bloody Sunday at Westminster, he was shouted down and physically attacked by Conservative MP John Elsdale Molson; the Speaker had to suspend the sitting.

In February 1920, Devlin was certain that a Parliament would be set up for six Counties within Ulster: "This will mean the worst form of partition and, of course, permanent partition... we Catholics and Nationalists could not, under any circumstances, consent to be placed under the domination of a parliament so skilfully established as to make it impossible for us to be ever other than a permanent minority, with all the sufferings and tyranny of the present day continued, only in a worse form." (see The Troubles in Ulster (1920–1922)) Speaking in the British House of Commons on the day the Government of Ireland Act 1920 was passed, Devlin made clear the feelings of many Nationalists concerning partition and the setting up of a Northern Ireland Parliament:

"I know beforehand what is going to be done with us, and therefore it is well that we should make our preparations for that long fight which, I suppose, we will have to wage in order to be allowed even to live." Referring to the Government of Ireland Act, he accused the government of "...not inserting a single clause...to safeguard the interests of our people. This is not a scattered minority...it is the story of weeping women, hungry children, hunted men, homeless in England, houseless in Ireland. If this is what we get when they have not their Parliament, what may we expect when they have that weapon, with wealth and power strongly entrenched? What will we get when they are armed with Britain's rifles, when they are clothed with the authority of government, when they have cast round them the Imperial garb, what mercy, what pity, much less justice or liberty, will be conceded to us then? That is what I have to say about the Ulster Parliament."

In order to prevent an Ulster Unionists "walk-over" win in the first election for the Northern Ireland House of Commons (1921), Devlin agreed to a pact with de Valera - Nationalists would not stand for election against Sinn Féiners; both parties co-operated during the election and won 6 seats each, the Unionists 40. Devlin, who represented a more moderate nationalist view, was elected for both Antrim and Belfast West. He chose to sit for Belfast West although his seat in the seven member Antrim constituency was left vacant for the rest of the Parliament. He continued to sit at Westminster as leader of the Nationalist Party of Northern Ireland, as both small parties did not recognise the Stormont parliament. His Belfast Falls seat was abolished in 1922, when Devlin unsuccessfully fought Liverpool Exchange; he returned to Westminster in 1929.

Devlin was re-elected by a large majority in Belfast West in 1925 when he decided to lead his small party out of abstentionism and sat for the first time in the Parliament of Northern Ireland as head of a powerless opposition. Devlin sought to highlight Catholic grievances, especially in relation to education. He was returned for the four member constituency until Proportional Representation by the Single Transferable Vote was abolished for territorial constituencies and single member seats were introduced for the 1929 election.

In 1927, Devlin was urged by Alfie Byrne to stand in the Irish general election (for a seat in the Dublin parliament) but he refused saying "If I do that, the poor people of Belfast, who have stood by me loyally for the past thirty years and who are undergoing the tortures of the damned will, I fear, think I am taking this opportunity of slipping out of a difficult position."

From 1929 until his death, Joe Devlin was the Northern Ireland MP for Belfast Central. He won amendment to the Northern Ireland Education Act of 1930 which improved the funding of Catholic schools. Otherwise they were years of demoralisation for northern Catholics, and the party abstained after 1932 due to the abolishment of proportional representation, when frustration finally drove him and his followers out of the Belfast parliament again, when his party abstained.

After his death, James Craig, the Prime Minister of Northern Ireland and leader of the Ulster Unionist Party, said: "He and I were in opposite political camps for over thirty years, and fought for our respective parties, necessarily at times with keen enmity, but throughout I have never entertained anything but admiration for his personal character".

== Personal background ==
"Wee Joe", as he was popularly known, was held in high affection by his constituents for his charming and effervescent personality. He was a fluent and powerful orator. In later years he was comfortably off as director of the Distillery Company and chairman of the Irish News, and enjoyed organising summer fêtes – "days of delight" – for Belfast children. His approach in life was 'getting things done'. He lived most of his life in Belfast, though he spent some earlier years in London. An acknowledged spokesman and leader of Catholic nationalists in Ulster for decades, Devlin died in Belfast on 18 January 1934. He was buried at Milltown Cemetery. His funeral at St. Peter's, Belfast, was attended by leading members of both Irish governments. The AOH hall in Ardboe, County Tyrone, is named after him.

He never married.

== Sources ==
- Parliamentary Election Results in Ireland, 1801–1922, edited by B.M. Walker (Royal Irish Academy 1978)
- Northern Ireland Parliamentary Election Results 1921–1972, by Sydney Elliott (Political Reference Publications 1973)
- British Parliamentary Election Results 1918–1949, compiled and edited by F.W.S. Craig (The Macmillan Press 1977)
- A Dictionary of Irish History since 1800, D. J. Hickey & J. E. Doherty, Gill & MacMillan (1980)
- Who's Who in The long Gestation, Patrick Maume (1999) p. 225, ISBN 0-7171-2744-3
- Oxford Dictionary of National Biography, A. C. Hepburn, Vol.15 pp. 983,984, Oxford University Press, (2004)
- The Evolution of Irish National Politics, Tom Garvin, Gill & MacMillan (1981) (2005), pp. 105–110 "The Rise of the Hibernians", ISBN 0-7171-3967-0
- Dividing Ireland, World War 1 and Partition, Thomas Hennessey, Routledge Press (1998), ISBN 0-415-17420-1
- Home Rule, an Irish History 1800–2000, Alvin Jackson, Phoenix Press (2003), ISBN 0-7538-1767-5
- "Devlin, Joseph" . Thom's Irish Who's Who . Dublin: Alexander Thom and Son Ltd. 1923. p. 61 – via Wikisource.

Parliament of the United Kingdom
Preceded by Patrick McDermott	Member of Parliament for North Kilkenny; 1902–1906	Succeeded by Michael Meagher
Preceded by H. O. Arnold-Forster	Member of Parliament for Belfast West; 1906–1918	Constituency abolished
New constituency	Member of Parliament for Belfast Falls; 1918–1922	Constituency abolished
Preceded by James Pringle; Charles Falls	Member of Parliament for Fermanagh and Tyrone; 1929–1934; With: Thomas Harbison to 1931; Cahir Healy from 1931	Succeeded by Joe Stewart; Cahir Healy
Parliament of Northern Ireland
New constituency	Member of Parliament for Belfast West; 1921–1929; With: Robert Lynn; Thomas Henry Burn to 1925; William J. Twaddell to 1923; Philip James Woods from 1923; William McMullen from 1925	Constituency abolished
New constituency	Member of Parliament for Belfast Central; 1929–1934	Succeeded by Thomas Joseph Campbell
Party political offices
New title	Leader of the Nationalist Party at Stormont; 1922–1934	Succeeded by Thomas Joseph Campbell
