= John Pope Hennessy =

Irish-born British politician, 8th Governor of Hong Kong

Sir John Pope Hennessy KCMG
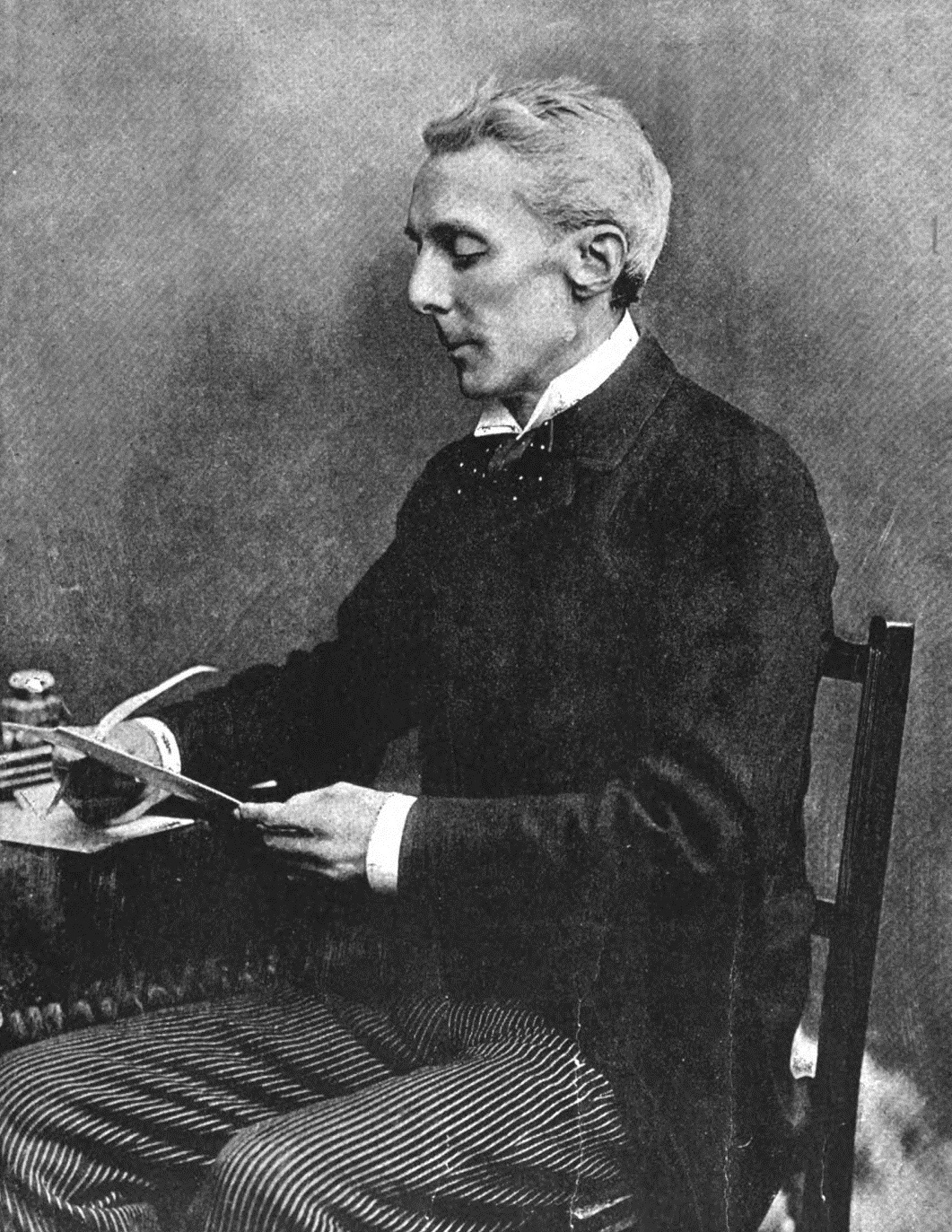

15th Governor of Mauritius
- In office 1 June 1883 – 11 December 1889
- Monarch: Victoria
- Preceded by: Sir Frederick Napier Broome
- Succeeded by: Sir Charles Cameron Lees

8th Governor of Hong Kong
- In office 23 April 1877 – 30 March 1883
- Monarch: Victoria
- Lieutenant Governor: Sir Francis Colborne; Edward Donovan; John Sargent
- Colonial Secretary: John Gardiner Austin; William Henry Marsh
- Preceded by: Sir Arthur Edward Kennedy
- Succeeded by: Sir George Bowen

10th Governor of Barbados and the Windward Islands
- In office 1875–1876
- Preceded by: Sanford Freeling, acting
- Succeeded by: George Cumine Strahan

25th Governor of the Bahamas
- In office 1873–1874
- Monarch: Victoria
- Preceded by: Sir George Cumine Strahan
- Succeeded by: Sir William Robinson

Governor of Sierra Leone
- In office 1872–1873
- Monarch: Victoria
- Preceded by: John Jennings Kendall, acting
- Succeeded by: Robert Keate

Governor of the Gold Coast
- In office 1872–1872
- Monarch: Victoria
- Preceded by: Herbert Taylor Ussher
- Succeeded by: Charles Spencer Salmon, acting

6th Governor of Labuan
- In office 1867–1871
- Monarch: Victoria
- Preceded by: Hugh Low (acting)
- Succeeded by: Sir Henry Ernest Gascoyne Bulwer

Personal details
- Born: 8 August 1834 County Cork, Ireland
- Died: 7 October 1891 (aged 57) Rostellan Castle, County Cork, Ireland
- Party: Irish Parliamentary Party
- Other political affiliations: Conservative (1859–1865)
- Spouse: Catherine Elizabeth Low (m. 1868)
- Domestic partner: A. M. Conyngham
- Children: 2 daughters, 3 sons
- Education: Queen's University of Ireland

Chinese name
- Traditional Chinese: 軒尼詩
- Simplified Chinese: 轩尼诗
Transcriptions
Yue: Cantonese
- Yale Romanization: Hīn nèih sī
- Jyutping: Hin^{1} nei^{4} si^{1}

Sir John Pope Hennessy KCMG (Chinese: 軒尼詩; 8 August 1834 – 7 October 1891), was an Irish politician and colonial administrator who served as the eighth Governor of Hong Kong and the fifteenth Governor of Mauritius.

== Early life ==
John Pope Hennessy was born in County Cork in 1834, the son of John Hennessy of Ballyhennessy and his wife Elizabeth Casey. He was one of eight children. The family were middle class Roman Catholics, with his father working as a hide merchant. He suffered from bronchitis as a child and was therefore initially privately tutored. In 1850 he entered Queen's College, Cork, initially studying in the science division of the faculty of arts. During his first year he was awarded a scholarship as he was one of the top three students, and this allowed him to transfer to medicine. He proved to be a gifted student scoring honours in five out of six subjects in his finals, came first in surgery and second in medicine.

In May 1855 he went to London to further his studies at Charing Cross Hospital. He then entered public service.

== Public service ==
He started his Public Service career as the Supplemental Clerk at the Privy Council, and eventually became a minor Conservative member of the British Parliament, representing King's County from 1859 to 1865. Whilst an MP he studied law at the Inner Temple, being called to the bar in 1861. In 1890, as MP for North Kilkenny he joined the Irish National Federation. He died the following year.

== Early colonial service ==
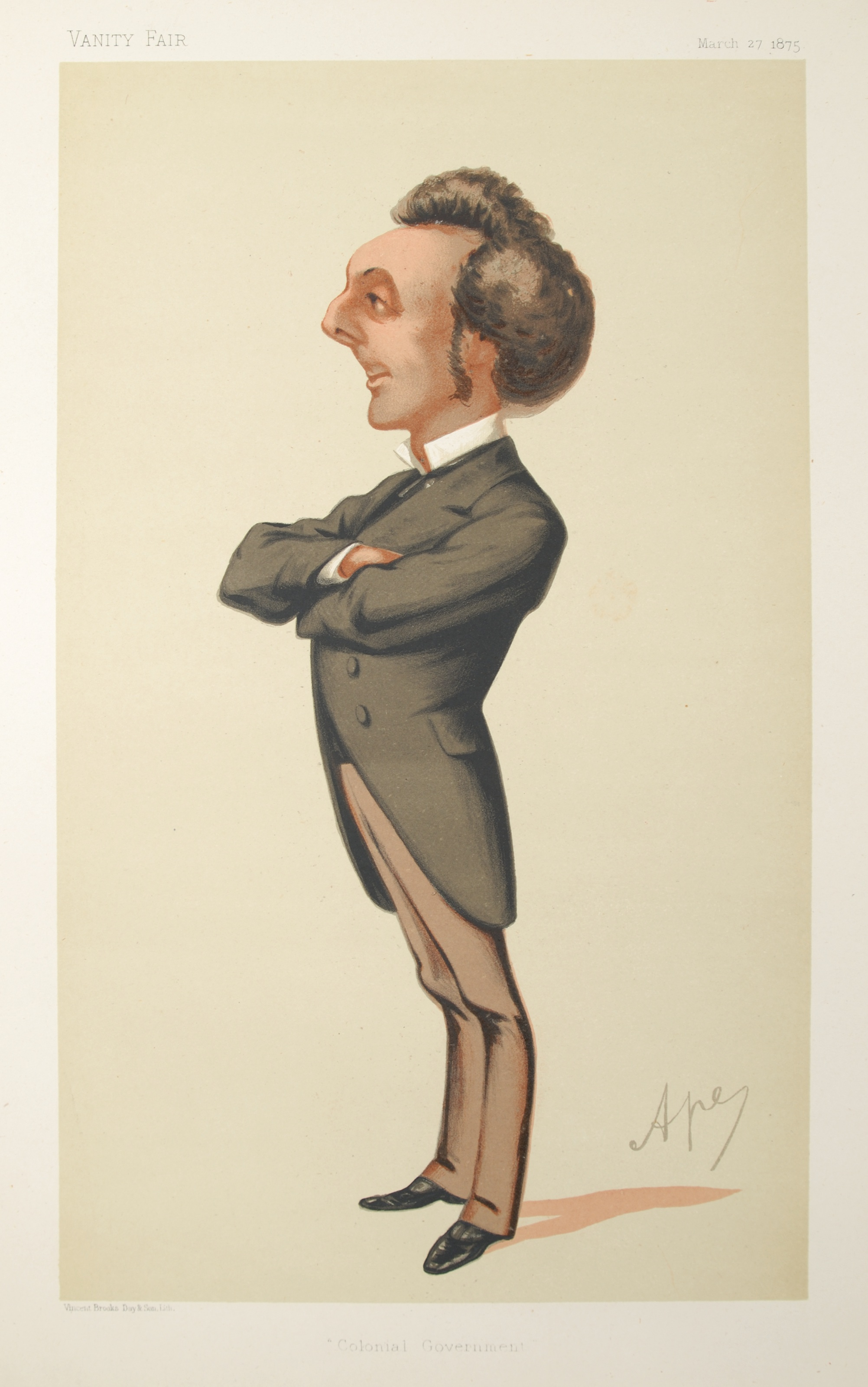
Caricature by Ape in Vanity Fair, 1875

Hennessy eventually joined the Colonial Office and became colonial Governor of Labuan in 1867 where he put the Crown Colony into solvency by introducing convict labour from the Straits Settlements. He went on to become the Governor of Sierra Leone from 1872 to 1873, when he moved to the governorship of the Bahamas. He became Governor-in-Chief of the Windward Islands, from 1873 until 1877, with primary authority over Barbados, and executive oversight over the various British Lt. Governors and Administrators charged with running day-to-day affairs on the various islands.

Hennessy's status as a Roman Catholic made him something of an outsider, particularly in his dealings with Protestant British colonial elites, whether in Barbados, Hong Kong, or Mauritius. Indeed, his earliest contributions as a Member of Parliament in 1860 pertained to the temporal power of the Pope, and unfolding events in Italy. Coming into colonial administration, he was among a cohort of "new thinkers" whose ideas gained ground following the Sepoy Mutiny in India in 1857. Speaking at length in the House of Commons on 26 July 1860 about British civil and military forces in India, Hennessy urged a shift in policies so that "the military administration of India would be conducted with greater skill, with more economy, and, as a natural result of a higher educational standard, with a greater regard for the feelings and interests of the Native population. Indeed, recent events furnished us with the most conclusive evidence that many of the British officers, entrusted with grave authority in India, had, from an ignorance of popular customs and a disregard of national habits and traditions, given great cause of complaint and encouragement to disaffection. As long as we send out officers to India who seem inclined to treat the Natives as slaves, who seem unable or unwilling to appreciate the noble qualities, of that unfortunate people, and who add the grossest military outrages and insults to the civil misgovernment and financial burdens we have imposed upon them, so long will our rule in India be a blot upon civilization".

== Governor of Hong Kong ==
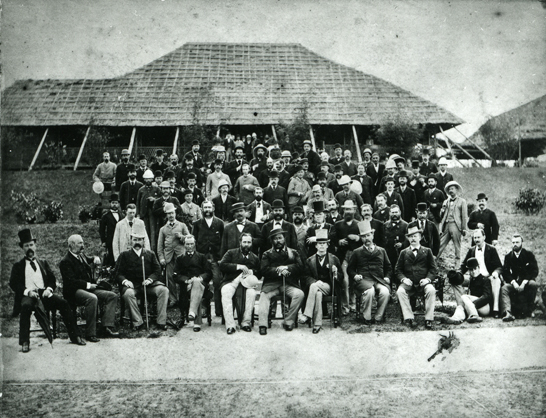
Hawaiian King Kalakaua visits Hong Kong in 1881. Hennessy is sitting immediately to the left of the King

Immediately after his tenure in Barbados, Hennessy was appointed as Governor of Hong Kong, a position from which he served until 1882.

During his tenure, Hennessy realised that the Chinese people, who were treated as second-class citizens up to that time, had developed an increasingly important influence on the Hong Kong economy. With that in mind, he lifted the ban that forbade Chinese people from buying land, constructing buildings, and operating businesses in the Central District. This caused a development boom in the Central District. Also, he allowed Chinese immigrants in Hong Kong to naturalise as British subjects. He appointed the first Chinese member (Ng Choy, who would later become the Minister of Foreign Affairs of the Republic of China) to the Legislative Council.

In 1878, Hennessy also mandated that English be taught in all government schools in Hong Kong.

Due to his progressive attitude he was known by the Chinese as "Number One Good Friend".

Also, during his rule, Hennessy established the first Grant-in-Aid system, a milestone in the educational history of Hong Kong.

Soon after arriving in Hong Kong, in April 1877, Hennessy set out to implement the "separate system" in Victoria Gaol, meaning separate cells for prisoners, during the night if not also during the day. This plan hinged upon sending long-term prisoners to Labuan for convict labour.

== Governor of Mauritius ==
After his tenure as Governor of Hong Kong was over, Hennessy went on to become the 15th Governor of Mauritius from 1 June 1883 to 11 December 1889. Upon his arrival on 1 June 1883 on the island, Hennessy undertook to mauricianise the local administration by reducing the powers of the English officials, appointing Mauritians to positions of responsibility and proposing a new constitution based on the principle "Mauritius for Mauritians". It was therefore natural that he moved closer to the Mauritian lawyer William Newton, leader of the reform movement who demanded a more direct involvement of Indo Mauritians and coloured settlers in the administration of their affairs. In 1886 Hennessy was suspended from office for some months during an enquiry into allegations of involvement in local politics as well as the collapse of a bank. It was under Hennessy that Mauritius knew its first shudder of democracy. This was his last post in the Colonial Service.

== Personal life ==
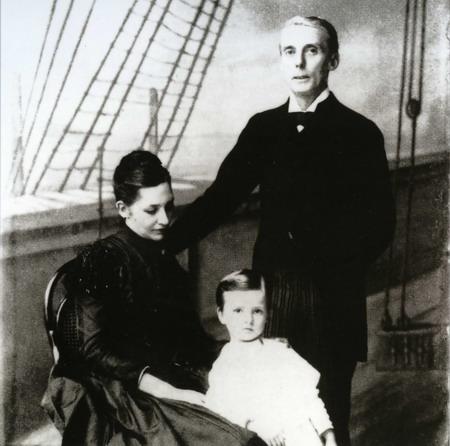
Hennessy's family

Hennessy had two illegitimate daughters with his mistress, Miss A. M. Conyngham, before, on 4 February 1868, marrying Catherine "Kitty" Elizabeth Low (1850–1923), daughter of Hugh Low, his predecessor as Governor of Labuan. They had three sons, including Richard Pope-Hennessy. Richard had two sons, art historian John Wyndham Pope-Hennessy (1913–1994) and writer James Pope-Hennessy (1916–1974), who authored a biography of his grandfather, Verandah, in 1964.

His personal motto was "Three Grand Qualifications to Success", which he described as "The first is audacity, the second is audacity, and the third is audacity".

Hennessy died of heart failure on 7 October 1891 at his residence, Rostellan Castle, near Cork, Ireland.

== Honours ==
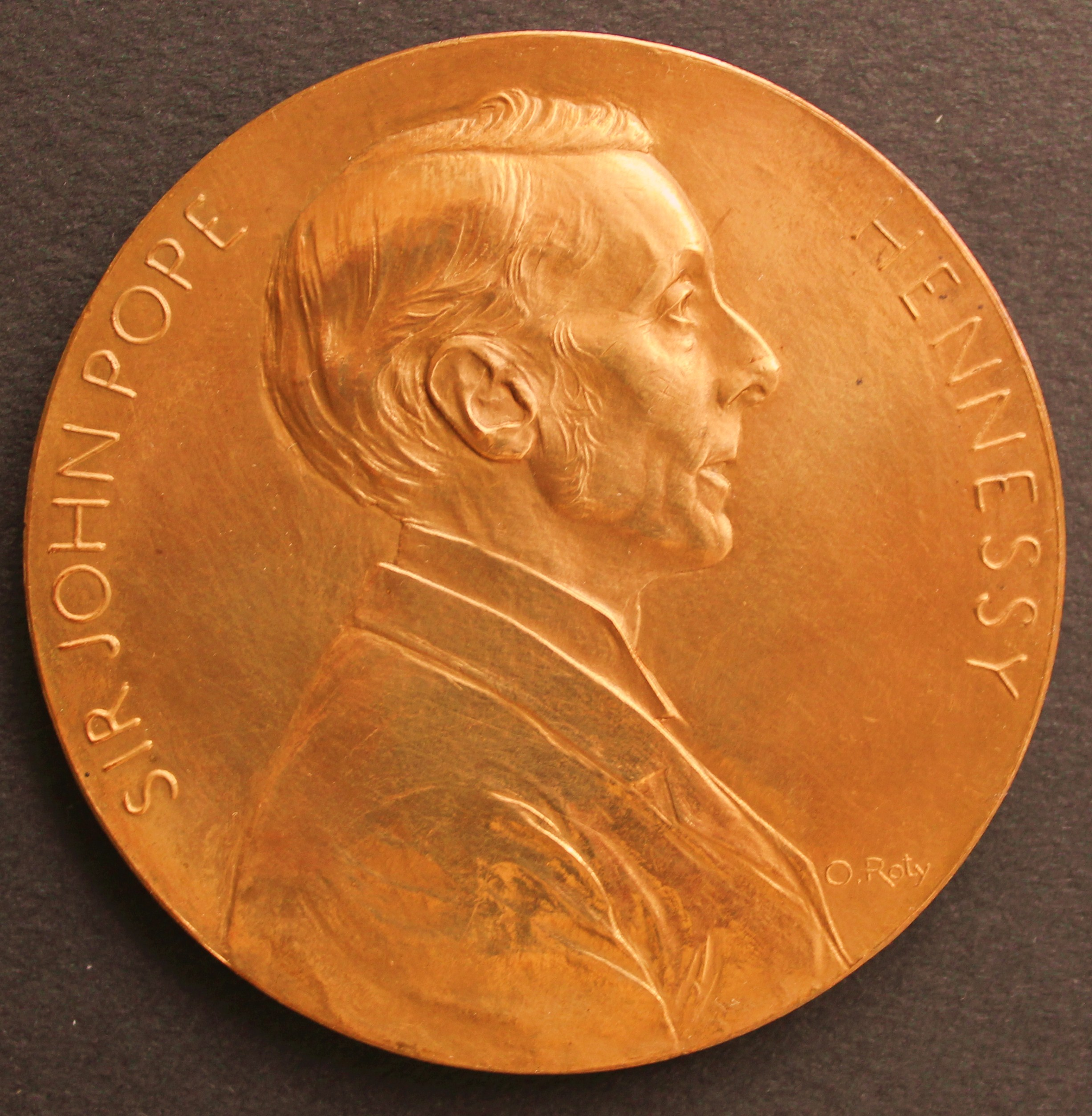
Sir John Pope Hennessy Governor of Mauritius, medal by Oscar Roty

- KCMG (1880)

== Memorials ==
As he was not popular among the European community of Hong Kong, there were no contemporary memorials there. However, on 14 June 1929, a main road located on the new reclamation was called Hennessy Road, and there is now also a crowded commercial and shopping area at Wan Chai and Causeway Bay on Hong Kong Island named after him. In Port Louis, capital of Mauritius, there is both a major street, Pope Hennessy Street, and a statue by M. Loumeau erected in 1908. Hennessy Road, a street in civil lines, Nagpur, Maharashtra state, India is also named after him.

== Sources ==
- "Sir John Pope Hennessy dead" (PDF). The New York Times.
- Pope-Hennessy, James (1964). Verandah: Some Episodes in the Crown Colonies: 1867–1889. London: George Allen and Unwin.

Parliament of the United Kingdom
Preceded by Sir Patrick O'Brien, Bt; Loftus Henry Bland	Member of Parliament for King's County; 1859 – 1865; With: Sir Patrick O'Brien, Bt	Succeeded by Sir Patrick O'Brien, Bt; John Gilbert King
Preceded by Edward Marum	Member of Parliament for North Kilkenny; 1890 – 1891	Succeeded by Patrick McDermott
Government offices
Preceded by Hugh Low (acting)	Governor of Labuan; 1867–1871	Succeeded by Sir Henry Ernest Gascoyne Bulwer
Preceded by Herbert Taylor Ussher	Governor of the Gold Coast; 1872	Succeeded by Charles Spencer Salmon, acting
Preceded by John Jennings Kendall, acting	Governor of Sierra Leone; 1872–1873	Succeeded by Robert Keate
Preceded by George Cumine Strahan	Governor of the Bahamas; 1873–1874	Succeeded by Sir William Robinson
Preceded by Sanford Freeling, acting	Governor of Barbados and the Windward Islands; 1876–1877	Succeeded by George Cumine Strahan
Preceded by Sir Arthur Edward Kennedy	Governor of Hong Kong; 1877–1882	Succeeded by Sir William Henry Marsh, acting
Preceded by Sir Frederick Napier Broome	Governor of Mauritius; 1883–1889	Succeeded by Sir Charles Cameron Lees
