= Michael Meagher =

Michael Meagher (27 February 1846 – December 1927) was an Irish nationalist politician. A member of the Irish Parliamentary Party, he was elected Member of Parliament for North Kilkenny at a by-election in 1906, and held the seat until the 1918 general election.

Parliament of the United Kingdom
Preceded by Joseph Devlin (Irish Parliamentary Party)	Member of Parliament for North Kilkenny; 1906–1918	Succeeded by W. T. Cosgrave (Sinn Féin)
