= Living Linen =

The Living Linen Project was set up in 1995 as an oral archive of the knowledge of the Irish linen industry still available within a nucleus of people who were formerly working in the industry in Ulster.

For over three hundred years linen manufacture has been an important industry, particularly in the 18th and 19th centuries. In Northern Ireland practically every town and village had a mill or a factory.

By 1921 there were almost one million spindles and 37,000 looms, with over 70,000 directly employed, representing 40% of the registered working population, with closer to 100,000 people dependent on the linen industry. At end of the 20th century only 10 significant companies, at most, remained employing 4,000 people.

This then was the motivation for the Living Linen Project, which aimed to collect recollections of this great industry while it was still possible.

== Phase One ==
Phase I of the Project a team of volunteers conducted almost ninety interviews. These oral recordings, and transcriptions being placed in the Ulster Folk and Transport Museum, Cultra, County Down.

The interviews were with the former managers of the industry and members of the families whose firms made up the industry in the twentieth century. After four years, it became clear to the Living Linen Management Committee that the interviews should be carried on with a much wider range of people.

== Phase Two ==
Phase II, in 1999 the Heritage Lottery Fund awarded Living Linen a grant for the employment of an oral history researcher to conduct interviews, with all levels of employees. This covered managers, foremen, charge-hands, engineers; spinning, weaving, marketing, bleaching and dyeing firms' employees; machine operatives, cloth inspectors, clerical, bookkeepers, chemical and dye suppliers, mill furnishers, accountants, stores and shops that sold linen, and finally couturiers and fashion designers who used linen.

== Living Linen Index ==
An index, is available from the Ulster Folk and Transport Museum, which lists the linen companies with the associated names of people who were interviewed. The recordings may be listened to at the Library, Administration Building, Ulster Folk and Transport Museum, Museums and Galleries of Northern Ireland, Cultra, County Down, Northern Ireland. A telephone call to the museum would be advisable at 00 44 (0) 28 9042 8428 before accessing the collection.
