= Sir Andrew Armstrong, 1st Baronet =

Irish baronet & politician (1786–1863)

Sir Andrew Armstrong, 1st Baronet DL (19 October 1786 – 27 January 1863) was an Irish baronet and politician.

== Early life ==
Born at Gallen Priory in County Offaly, Armstrong was the son of Edmund Armstrong and his wife Elizabeth, third daughter of Frederick Trench and sister of Frederick Trench, 1st Baron Ashtown.

== Career as politician ==
Armstrong served as captain in the King's County Militia. and was appointed High Sheriff of King's County in 1811, and again in 1836, and served as deputy lieutenant of that county. He became Receiver General of Stamps in Ireland in 1831, an office he held until its abolition in 1841, when he was created a baronet, of Gallen Priory, in King's County as compensation.

In February of the same year, he entered the British House of Commons in a by-election, sitting for King's County until 1852. While in Parliament he argued against the laws restricting commerce in Ireland ...'I never can be satisfied that my country should be bound in calfskin'..., for the establishment of ship manufacturing in Ireland, and for provisions to be made for the Catholic Clergy.

== Marriage and later life ==
In 1835, Armstrong married Frances, daughter of George Alexander Fullerton, and had by her six sons. He died aged 76 at Chester and was succeeded in the baronetcy by his eldest son Edmund.

His youngest son, Charles Nesbitt Frederick Armstrong (1858–1948), born when his father was 71 or 72, went to Queensland, Australia, and married Helen Porter Mitchell (the opera singer, Dame Nellie Melba) in 1882. They had a son, George, but separated after a year and later divorced.

Parliament of the United Kingdom
Preceded by John Craven Westenra; Nicholas Fitzsimon	Member of Parliament for King's County; 1841 – 1852; With: John Craven Westenra	Succeeded by Sir Patrick O'Brien, 2nd Bt; Loftus Henry Bland
Baronetage of the United Kingdom
New creation	Baronet (of Gallen Priory); 1841–1863	Succeeded by Edmund Frederick Armstrong
