= James Drought (theologian) =

Irish theologian

James Drought (1738 – 1820) was an Irish academic.

Drought was born in County Offaly (then called King's County) and educated at Trinity College Dublin. He became a Fellow of Trinity College in 1762, a lecturer in 1778 and Regius Professor of Divinity there in 1790.

He was a member of the Drought family prominent in County Offaly.
