= Gallen Abbey =

Ruined monastery in County Offaly, Ireland

- Mainistir Ghailinne
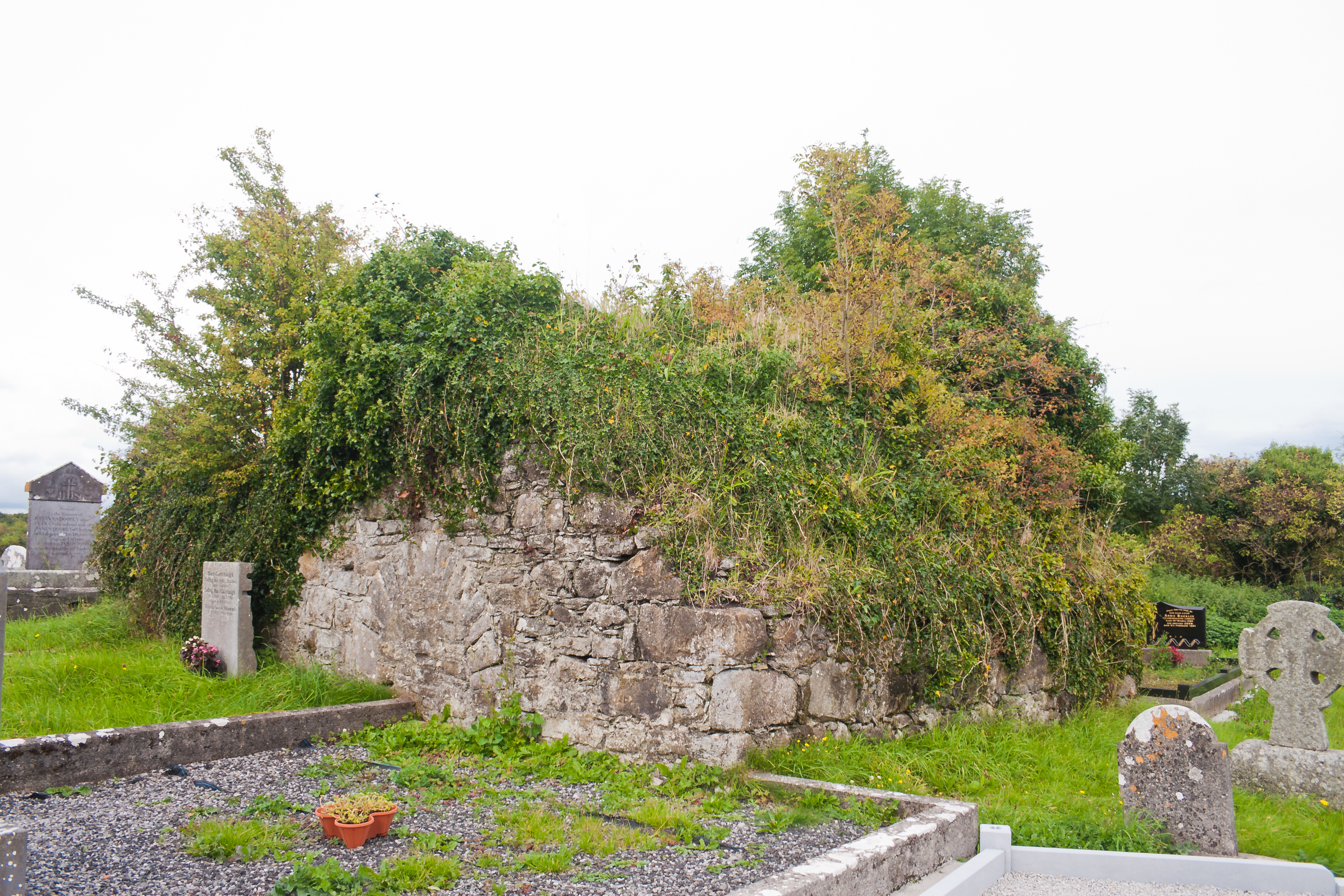

- Location within Ireland
- Interactive map of Gallen Abbey

Monastery information
- Order: Celtic Christianity
- Established: 492
- Disestablished: 1571
- Diocese: Ardagh

People
- Founder: Saint Canoc

Architecture
- Status: Inactive
- Style: Irish monastic

Site
- Location: Gallen, County Offaly
- Coordinates: 53.26267°N 7.82334°W,
- Public access: Yes

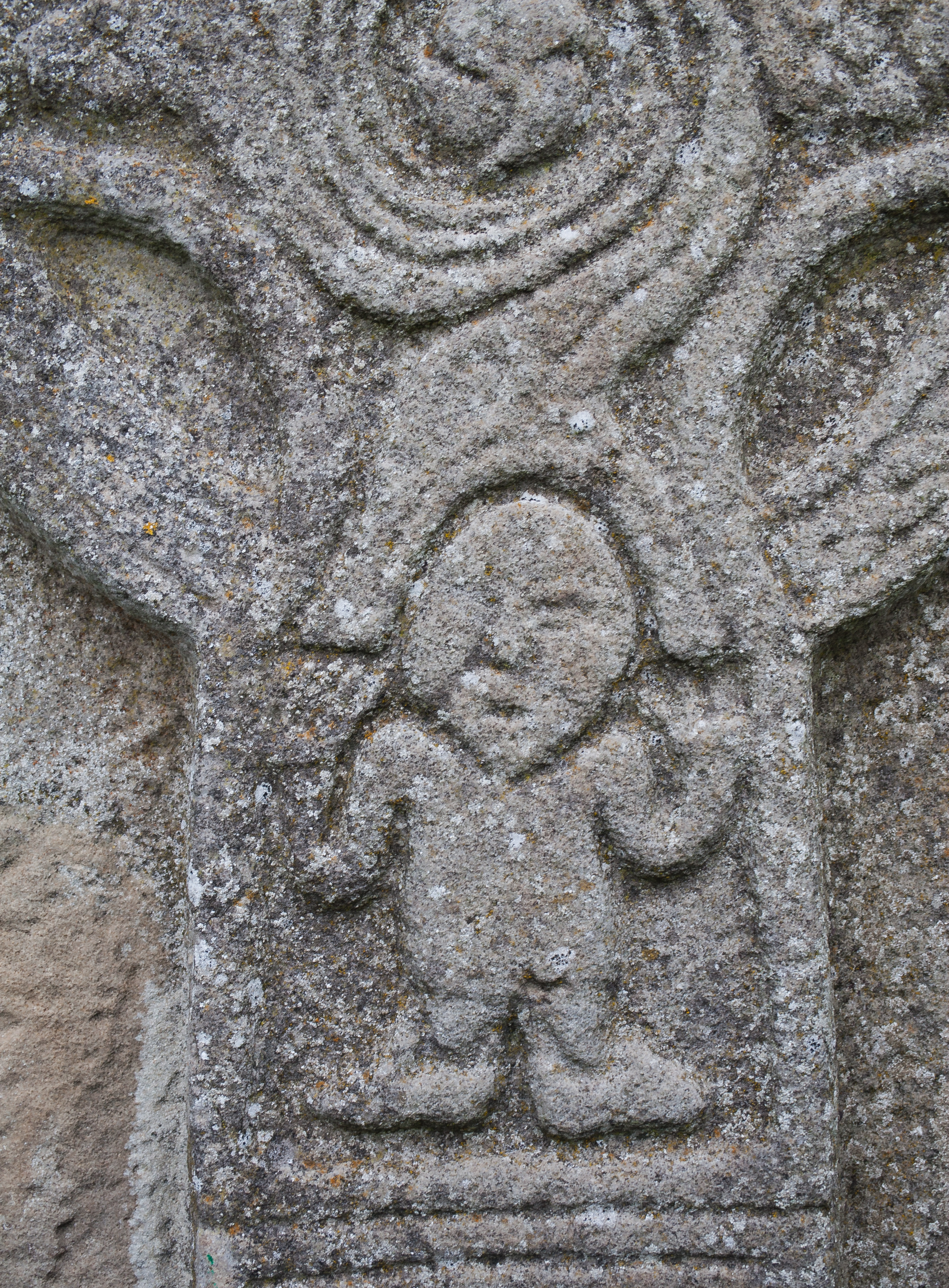
Gallen Priory Early Monastic Site Ringed Cross with Biting Serpents Detail 2010 09 10

Gallen Abbey or Gallen Priory is a medieval monastery and National Monument located in County Offaly, Ireland.

== Location ==
Gallen Abbey is located on the south bank of the Brosna, about 1 km south of Ferbane.

== History ==
Gallen Abbey was established in AD 492 by Saint Canoc, a son of Saint Brecan. Saint Canoc settled near modern-day Ferbane in 492, which at the time was in the territory of Delbhna Eathra. The Abbey was damaged in the 820s when Tnúthgal mac Donngaile, the king of Munster, invaded Delbna Eathra, the area in which the abbey was located. The monastery was later restored by Welsh monks, who turned it into a very successful school. In 949, Cellachán Caisil, another king of Munster, invaded Delbna Eathra and nearly demolished the abbey. A stone church on the abbey grounds was destroyed in the attack, and today the oldest building at the site of the former abbey dates to the 11th century. Gallen Priory has a number of grave slabs dating from the 8th to the 11th centuries. Many of the slabs have interlacing, wheel (or sun) crosses and plain incised crosses.

Despite much resistance, the Irish Church was reformed in the 12th century, allowing Papal authority to be more fully exercised in Ireland. Religious orders were especially affected, as The Lateran Council of 1159 had urged the clergy of Cathedrals and Collegiate Churches to adopt some form of regular life, in particular the Rule of St. Augustine. Irish monks, including those at the Gallen Abbey, reluctantly conformed to the Catholic Church's demands, and gradually abandoned the Irish Church's Celtic traditions. Around this time, the Mac Coughlan family rose to power in the region that surrounded the abbey. The heads of the family usually combined the offices of ruler of the clan and Prior of the monastery. The Mac Coughlan family would continue to remain prominent in local politics until the 18th century.

Despite the proclamation of the Plantations of Laois and Offaly in 1556, fierce guerilla warfare against British troops by the local citizens stalled English settlement of the area for fifty years. In 1571, George Bouchyer was to be granted control over the lands around the abbey. After several disputes over the ownership of the land, Sir Gerard Moore was granted the land in 1612 for an annual rent of £3-12-2. These lands consisted of the church, a cemetery, five cottages and two gardens in the town of Gallen, forty acres of farmland, and thirty acres of pastures and forests.

The last family to own the abbey lands were the Armstrongs – a family of Scottish origin who had come to the region before 1745. In 1841, Andrew Armstrong was created a baronet, and it was from his grandson, Sir Andrew Harvey Armstrong, that the Sisters of Saint Joseph of Cluny purchased the property in 1923.

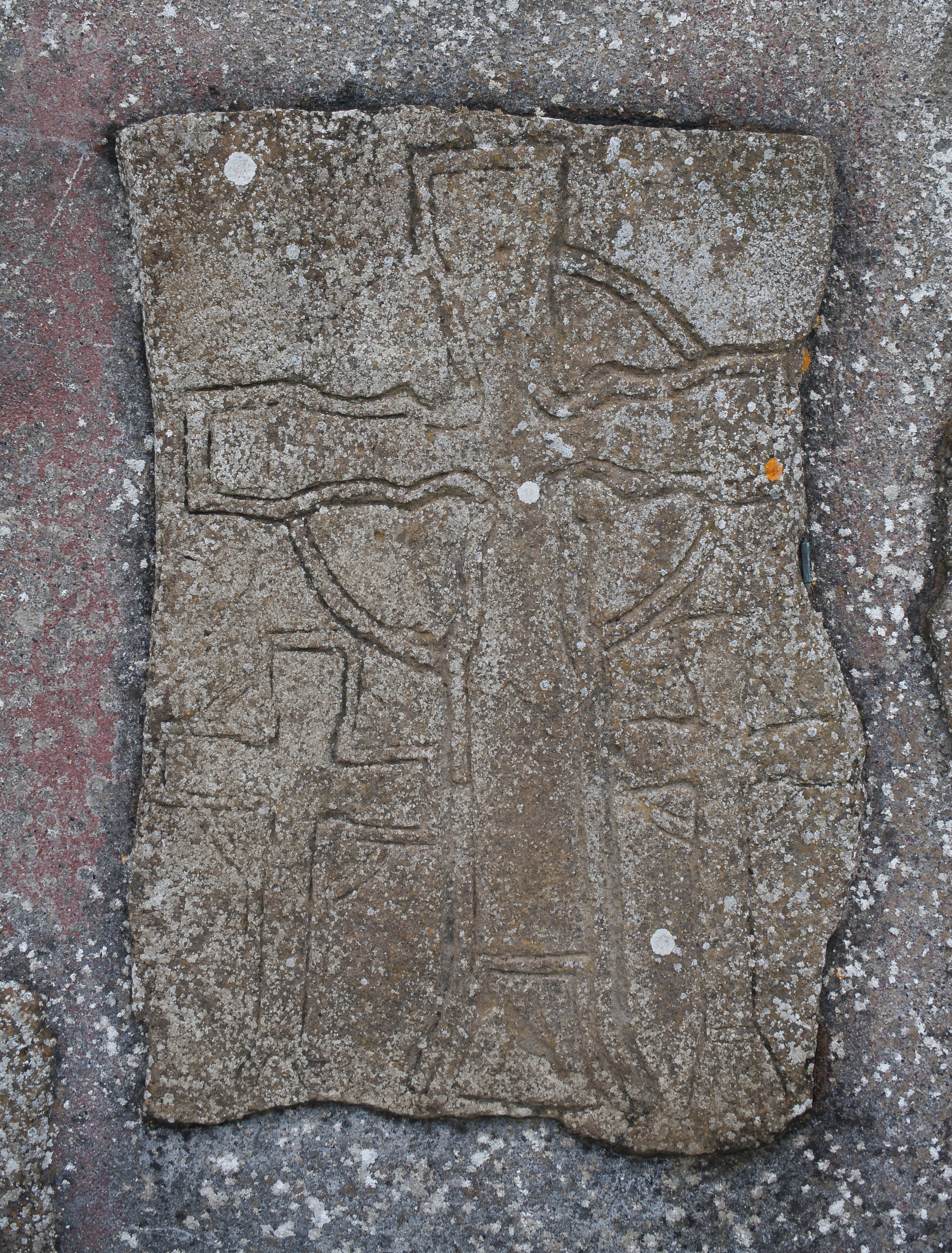
Gallen Priory Early Monastic Site Three Crosses 2010 09 10
