= Patrick McDermott (politician) =

Irish politician

Member of Parliament for North Kilkenny
- In office 1891-1902

Personal details
- Born: 1859
- Died: 1942 (aged 82–83)
- Party: Irish nationalist

Patrick McDermott (1859–1942) was an Irish nationalist politician. A member of the Anti-Parnellite Irish National Federation, he was elected to the United Kingdom House of Commons as Member of Parliament (MP) for North Kilkenny at a by-election in 1891. He resigned his seat in 1902.

Parliament of the United Kingdom
Preceded by John Pope Hennessy	Member of Parliament for North Kilkenny; 1891–1902	Succeeded by Joseph Devlin
