= Armstrong baronets =

Set index for Armstrong baronets

There have been two baronetcies created for persons with the surname Armstrong, both in the Baronetage of the United Kingdom. As of 2026 one creation is extant.

- Armstrong baronets of Gallen Priory (1841)
- Armstrong baronets of Ashburn Place (1892)
