= High Sheriff of King's County =

British Crown's judicial representative

The High Sheriff of King's County was the British Crown's judicial representative in King's County (now County Offaly), Ireland, from 1556, when King's County was created, until 1922, when the office was abolished in the new Free State and replaced by the office of Offaly County Sheriff. The sheriff had judicial, electoral, ceremonial and administrative functions and executed High Court writs. In 1908, an Order in Council made the Lord-Lieutenant the sovereign's prime representative in a county and reduced the High Sheriff's precedence. However, the sheriff retained his responsibilities for the preservation of law and order in the county. The usual procedure for appointing the sheriff from 1660 onwards was that three persons were nominated at the beginning of each year from the county and the Lord Lieutenant then appointed his choice as High Sheriff for the remainder of the year. Often the other nominees were appointed as under-sheriffs. Sometimes a sheriff did not fulfil his entire term through death or other event and another sheriff was then appointed for the remainder of the year. The dates given hereunder are the dates of appointment. All addresses are in King's County (County Offaly) unless stated otherwise.

== High Sheriffs of King's County ==
- 1656: Henry L'Estrange
- 1657: Sir George Blundell, 2nd Baronet
- 1662: Philip Bigoe
- 1663: Charles Lyons of River Lyons
- 1667: Thomas Wakely
- 1671: John Reading of Readingstown
- 1672: John Baldwin
- 1674: Jonathan Darby of Leap Castle
- 1680: Edward Bagot
- Robert Lovett
- 1693: Geoffrey Lyons of River Lyons
- 1694: James Sterling
- 1695: John Wakely of Ballyburly
- 1697: John Baldwin, jnr of Corolanty
- 1698: Hector Vaughan of Dromoyle and Knocknamease
- 1701: Richard Warburton of Garryhinch
- 1702: Geoffrey Lyons of River Lyons
- 1703: John Reading of Readingstown
- 1704: Geoffrey Lyons of River Lyons
- 1705: Francis Heaton of Mount Heaton
- 1707: Peter Holmes of Johnstown
- 1708:Sir George Seymour
- 1711: James Forth of Charleville Castle
- 1713: George Holmes of Liscloony
- 1715: Colley Lyons, MP, of River Lyons
- 1717: Benjamin Frend of Boskell, County Limerick and Ballyreehy
- 1720: Henry Malone of Litter
- 1721:
- 1726: Thomas Wakely of Ballyburly
- 1730: Edmund Armstrong
- 1731:
- 1738: Warenford Armstrong
- 1738: Hector Vaughan of Fancroft
- 1740: John Frend of Boskell, County Limerick and Ballyreehy
- 1741: Nicholas Biddulph of Fortal and Rath-Robin
- 1744: Henry Lyons of River Lyons
- 1750: Arthur Judge of Readingstown
- 1751: Andrew Armstrong
- 1752: George Fraser of Park and Cuba House
- 1753:
- 1754: Peter Marsh of Moyally
- 1755: Francis Lumm, later Sir Francis Lumm, 1st Baronet of Lummville
- 1756:
- 1759: John O'Connor of Mount Pleasant

== George III, 1760–1820 ==
- 1763: John Wakely of Ballyburly
- 1764: Daniel Chenevix, of Ballycommon
- 1766: William Peisley Vaughan of Golden Grove
- 1768: John Minchin of Bushertown
- 1769:
- 1771: Gilbert Holmes of Belmont
- 1772: Owen Moony of Lackaghbeg
- 1774: Denis Bowes Daly
- 1777: Christopher Bor
- 1777: Andrew Armstrong of Castle Armstrong
- 1779: Sir William Parsons, 4th Baronet
- 1780: John Drought
- 1782: John King
- 1782: Benjamin Frend of Clooneen
- 1783: Maurice Nugent O'Connor
- 1784: James Frank Roleston of Dunkerrin
- 1785: Thomas Bernard, of Castle-Town
- 1786: John Warburton of Garryhinch
- 1787: Jonathan Darby of Leap Castle
- 1788:
- 1792: Thomas Ryder of Laughton
- 1793: William Carroll Moony of New Lawn, County Tipperary
- 1794: Robert James Enraght-Moony of The Doon
- 1796: John Wakely of Ballyburly
- 1798: Thomas Bernard of Castle Bernard
- 1799: Henry Verney Lovett Darby of Annvilla
- 1801: Richard Warburton of Garryhinch
- 1801: Joseph Studholme of Ballyeighan and Kilmaine
- 1802: Charles Baldwin
- 1803: Jackson Wray Atkinson of Cangort
- 1804: James Frank Rolleston of Frankfort Castle
- 1805: William Peasley Vaughan of Golden Grove
- 1806: Maunsell Andrews of Rathenny
- 1807: John Downing Nesbitt
- 1808: John Drought
- 1809: Thomas St George Armstrong of Garry Castle House
- 1810: George Arbuthnot Holmes of Moorock
- 1811: Sir Andrew Armstrong, Bt
- 1812: George Meares John Drought
- 1813: Humphrey Borr
- 1814: Henry Spunner
- 1815: George Marsh
- 1816: Thomas Homan Mulock of Bellair
- 1816: Henry Peisley l'Estrange, jnr of Moystown
- 1817: Richard Malone
- 1818: Edmund Armstrong
- 1819: Garrett O'Moore

== George IV, 1820–1830 ==
- 1820: Francis Moony Enragh-Moony of the Doon
- 1821: John Head Drought
- 1822: Thomas Hornan Molluck
- 1823: Benjamin Lucas
- 1824: George Minchin of Bushertown
- 1825: Lord Tullamore
- 1826: Sir Robert Waller, 2nd Baronet of Newport
- 1827: William H. Magan, Clocarl, Philipstown
- 1828: George Minchin of Bushertown

== William IV, 1830–1837 ==
- 1832: Francis Longworth-Dames of Greenhill
- 1834: John Tibeaudo, of Portnahinch, Portarlington
- 1835: Hector John Graham Toler, 3rd Earl of Norbury, of Durrow Abbey
- 1834: Sir Michael Cusac Smith of Newtown, Tullamore
- 1836: Sir Andrew Armstrong, Bt
- 1837: Thomas Bernard of Castle Bernard

== Victoria, 1837–1901 ==
- 1840: Henry Sandford Palmer of Ballinlough
- 1841: Garrett O'Moore of Cloghan Castle, Kinnitty
- 1842: Thomas Bernard of Castle Bernard
- 1844: Thomas Hackett of Moor Park
- 1845: Richard Warburton of Garryhinch
- 1846: Guy Atkinson of Cangort
- 1848: Charles B. Baldwin of London
- 1849: Thomas Homan Mulock of Bellaire, Ballycottier
- 1850: Edward John Corr, of Ballinolan, Ederderry
- 1852: John Gilbert King of Ballylinn, Ferbane
- 1853: John Wakely of Ballyburly
- 1854: Francis Valentine Bennett
- 1855: Robert James Enraght Moony of Mount Pleasant
- 1856: William G.D.Nesbitt of Thubberdaly House, Edenberry
- 1857:
- 1858: James Drought of Banagher
- 1859: Thomas Seymour of Ballymore Castle, Galway
- 1860: Edward John Briscoe of Screggan
- 1861: Hon. Alfred Bury, later 5th Earl of Charleville
- 1862: Arthur Henry Nicholas Kemmis
- 1863: John Craven Westenra
- 1864:
- 1866: John Lloyd of Gloster
- 1867: Lawrence Parsons, 4th Earl of Rosse
- 1868: Captain Maxwell Fox of Annaghmore
- 1869: Thomas Longworth-Dames of Greenhill
- 1870: George John Minchin of Bushertown
- 1871: Bernard Daly of Hazlebrook, Dublin and Tullamore
- 1872: Richard Warburton of Garryhinch
- 1873: Captain Ambrose Clement Wolseley Cox
- 1874: William Bassett Holmes of St David's
- 1875: Peter Hamlet Thompson of Stonestown and Park
- 1876: Marcus Goodbody of Inchmore
- 1877: Arthur Burdett of Coolfin
- 1878: William Peisley Hutchinson-Lloyd-Vaughan of Golden Grove
- 1879: John Sherlock of Rahan
- 1880: William Grogan Graves of Cloghan Castle, Banagher
- 1881:
- 1882: Henry Vincent Jackson of Inane
- 1883: Jonathan Charles Darby of Leap castle, Roscrea, County Tipperary
- 1884: Kenneth Howard Bury
- 1885: William Thomas Trench of Redwood, County Tipperary
- 1886: William Kennedy Marshall of Baronne Court, Ormond Lower
- 1887: Captain Caulfeild French of Castletehin, Roscommon and Castle Bernard, Kinnitty
- 1888: Arthur Frederick Churchhill Tollemache of Ballincur
- 1889: Capt. Thomas Armstrong Drought of Letty Brook, Kennitty
- 1890:
- 1892: Edward John Downing Beaumont-Nesbitt of Tubberdaly
- 1893: Hector Robert Graham Toler
- 1894: James Perry Goodbody of Inchmore
- 1895: William Bury Homan-Mulock of Bellair
- 1896: Arthur Hugo Florian de Burdet Burdett of Ballymany, County Kildare and Coolfin
- 1897: Bernard Daly of Dunboy
- 1898:
- 1899: Turner Oliver Read of Dungar House, Roscrea
- 1900: George Austin Medlen of Lowlands, Roscrea
- 1901:

== Edward VII, 1901–1910 ==
- 1901: Lieut.-Col. Middleton West Biddulph of Rathrobin, King's County
- 1902: Francis Berry Homan-Mulock of Ballycumber House.
- 1903: Henry Louis King of Ballylin.
- 1904: Christopher James Patrick Banon of Broughall Castle.
- 1905: Henry Charles White of Charleville. (also High Sheriff of Queen's County)
- 1906: John Hardress Lloyd of Gloster.
- 1907: Sylvester Rait Kerr of Edenderry.
- 1909: Launcelot Joseph Moore Studholme of Ballyeighan and Kilmaine.

== George V, 1910–1936 ==
- 1910: Valentine John Eustace Lenigan of Castle Ffogerty.
- 1911: Otway Scarlett Graham-Toler.
- 1914: Andrew Harvey Armstrong, 3rd Baronet.
- 1915:
- 1920: Georges Meares Stopford Enright-Moony.
- 1921: Charles Kenneth Howard-Bury.
