= King's County (UK Parliament constituency) =

UK parliamentary constituency in Ireland, 1801–1885 and 1918-1922

- Former county constituency for the House of Commons
- County: King's County

1801–1885
- Seats: 2
- Created from: King's County (IHC)
- Replaced by: King's County Birr; King's County Tullamore

1918–1922
- Created from: King's County Birr and King's County Tullamore (IHC)
- Replaced by: Laois–Offaly (in Dáil Éireann)

King's County was a parliamentary constituency in Ireland, represented in the House of Commons of the United Kingdom. It returned two Members of Parliament (MPs) from 1801 to 1885 and one from 1918 to 1922.

== Boundaries ==
This constituency comprised the whole of King's County now known as County Offaly.

== Members of Parliament ==
=== MPs 1801–1885 ===
Election	First member	First party	Second member	Second party
1801, 1 January	Sir Lawrence Parsons, Bt		Denis Bowes Daly	
1802, 22 July	Sir Lawrence Parsons, Bt		Thomas Bernard	Tory
1807, 22 May	Hardress Lloyd		Thomas Bernard	Tory
1818, 30 June	John Clere Parsons		Thomas Bernard	Tory
1821, 30 July	William Parsons, 3rd Earl of Rosse Lord Oxmantown	Tory	Thomas Bernard	Tory
1830, 12 August	William Parsons, 3rd Earl of Rosse Lord Oxmantown	Whig	Thomas Bernard	Tory
1833, 1 January	William Parsons, 3rd Earl of Rosse Lord Oxmantown	Whig	Nicholas Fitzsimon	Repeal Association
1835, 16 January	Hon. John Westenra	Whig	Nicholas Fitzsimon	Repeal Association
1841, 24 February	Hon. John Westenra	Whig	Sir Andrew Armstrong	Whig
1852, 26 July	Sir Patrick O'Brien, Bt	Independent Irish	Loftus Henry Bland	Independent Irish
1857, 11 April	Sir Patrick O'Brien, Bt	Whig	Loftus Henry Bland	Whig
1859, 19 May	Sir Patrick O'Brien, Bt	Liberal	John Pope Hennessy	Conservative
1865, 24 July	Sir Patrick O'Brien, Bt	Liberal	John Gilbert King	Conservative
1868, 23 November	Sir Patrick O'Brien, Bt	Liberal	David Sherlock	Liberal
1874, 11 February	Sir Patrick O'Brien, Bt	Home Rule	David Sherlock	Home Rule
1880, 13 April	Sir Patrick O'Brien, Bt	Home Rule	Bernard Charles Molloy	Home Rule
1885	Constituency divided: see King's County Birr and King's County Tullamore			

=== MPs 1918–1922 ===
Year	Member	Party
1918	Patrick McCartan	Sinn Féin
1922	Constituency abolished	

== Elections ==
- Note: Turnout estimated by dividing votes cast by 2. This will underestimate turnout to the extent that electors only used one of their two possible votes. Where there are two seats available but one party fields just one candidate, the turnout is estimated as the sum of the highest vote for each party. This method may overestimate turnout.

=== Elections in the 1830s ===
General election 1830: King's County (2 seats)
Party	Candidate	Votes	%
Whig	William Parsons	Unopposed	
Tory	Thomas Bernard	Unopposed	
Registered electors		1,139	
Whig gain from Tory			
Tory hold			

General election 1831: King's County (2 seats)
Party	Candidate	Votes	%
Whig	William Parsons	411	46.5
Tory	Thomas Bernard	316	35.8
Whig	John Westenra	156	17.7
Turnout		c. 600	c. 52.7
Registered electors		1,139	
Majority		95	10.7
Whig hold			
Majority		160	18.1
Tory hold			

General election 1832: King's County (2 seats)
Party	Candidate	Votes	%	±%
Irish Repeal	Nicholas Fitzsimon	755	44.8	New
Whig	William Parsons	471	27.9	−18.6
Tory	Thomas Bernard	460	27.3	−8.5
Turnout		1,043	79.6	c. +26.9
Registered electors		1,310		
Majority		295	17.5	N/A
Irish Repeal gain from Tory		Swing	N/A	
Majority		11	0.6	−10.1
Whig hold		Swing	−5.1	

General election 1835: King's County (2 seats)
Party	Candidate	Votes	%
Irish Repeal (Whig)	Nicholas Fitzsimon	Unopposed	
Whig	John Westenra	Unopposed	
Registered electors		1,514	
Irish Repeal hold			
Whig hold			

General election 1837: King's County (2 seats)
Party	Candidate	Votes	%
Irish Repeal (Whig)	Nicholas Fitzsimon	Unopposed	
Whig	John Westenra	Unopposed	
Registered electors		1,877	
Irish Repeal hold			
Whig hold			

=== Elections in the 1840s ===
Fitzsimon resigned by accepting the office of Steward of the Chiltern Hundreds, causing a by-election.

By-election, 24 February 1841: King's County
Party	Candidate	Votes	%	±%
Whig	Andrew Armstrong	426	67.0	N/A
Conservative	Thomas Bernard	210	33.0	New
Majority		216	34.0	N/A
Turnout		636	59.0	N/A
Registered electors		1,078		
Whig gain from Irish Repeal		Swing		

General election 1841: King's County (2 seats)
Party	Candidate	Votes	%	±%
Whig	John Westenra	Unopposed		
Whig	Andrew Armstrong	Unopposed		
Registered electors		1,078		
Whig hold				
Whig gain from Irish Repeal				

General election 1847: King's County (2 seats)
Party	Candidate	Votes	%	±%
Whig	John Westenra	Unopposed		
Whig	Andrew Armstrong	Unopposed		
Registered electors		1,370		
Whig hold				
Whig hold				

=== Elections in the 1850s ===
General election 1852: King's County (2 seats)
Party	Candidate	Votes	%	±%
Independent Irish	Patrick O'Brien	1,264	40.1	N/A
Independent Irish	Loftus Henry Bland	1,191	37.8	N/A
Conservative	Thomas Bernard	697	22.1	New
Majority		494	15.7	N/A
Turnout		1,925 (est)	80.3 (est)	N/A
Registered electors		2,397		
Independent Irish gain from Whig		Swing	N/A	
Independent Irish gain from Whig		Swing	N/A	

General election 1857: King's County (2 seats)
Party	Candidate	Votes	%	±%
Whig	Patrick O'Brien	Unopposed		
Whig	Loftus Henry Bland	Unopposed		
Registered electors		3,228		
Whig gain from Independent Irish				
Whig gain from Independent Irish				

General election 1859: King's County (2 seats)
Party	Candidate	Votes	%	±%
Conservative	John Pope Hennessy	1,301	27.8	New
Liberal	Patrick O'Brien	1,293	27.6	N/A
Liberal	Loftus Henry Bland	1,216	26.0	N/A
Liberal	Tristram Kennedy	867	18.5	N/A
Majority		85	1.8	N/A
Turnout		2,339 (est)	70.4 (est)	N/A
Registered electors		3,324		
Conservative gain from Liberal		Swing	N/A	
Liberal hold		Swing	N/A	

=== Elections in the 1860s ===
General election 1865: King's County (2 seats)
Party	Candidate	Votes	%	±%
Conservative	John Gilbert King	2,182	46.7	+32.8
Liberal	Patrick O'Brien	1,246	26.7	−45.4
Conservative	John Pope Hennessy	1,240	26.6	+12.7
Turnout		2,957 (est)	87.5 (est)	+17.1
Registered electors		3,380		
Majority		936	20.0	+18.2
Conservative hold		Swing	+27.8	
Majority		6	0.1	
Liberal hold		Swing	−45.5	

General election 1868: King's County (2 seats)
Party	Candidate	Votes	%	±%
Liberal	Patrick O'Brien	Unopposed		
Liberal	David Sherlock	Unopposed		
Registered electors		3,435		
Liberal hold				
Liberal gain from Conservative				

=== Elections in the 1870s ===
General election 1874: King's County (2 seats)
Party	Candidate	Votes	%	±%
Home Rule	Patrick O'Brien	2,009	48.8	New
Home Rule	David Sherlock	1,264	30.7	New
Home Rule	Bernard Charles Molloy	758	18.4	New
Home Rule	William Arnett Gowing	82	2.0	New
Majority		506	12.3	N/A
Turnout		2,057 (est)	60.4 (est)	N/A
Registered electors		3,407		
Home Rule gain from Liberal		Swing		
Home Rule gain from Liberal		Swing		

=== Elections in the 1880s ===
General election 1880: King's County (2 seats)
Party	Candidate	Votes	%	±%
Home Rule	Patrick O'Brien	1,893	43.0	+5.8
Home Rule	Bernard Charles Molloy	1,712	38.9	+8.2
Conservative	Henry Vincent Jackson	801	18.2	New
Majority		911	20.7	+8.4
Turnout		2,694 (est)	84.0 (est)	+23.6
Registered electors		3,208		
Home Rule hold		Swing	N/A	
Home Rule hold		Swing	N/A	

- Constituency abolished 1885 and re-created as a single member constituency 1918

=== Elections in the 1910s ===
1918 general election: King's County
Party	Candidate	Votes	%	±%
Sinn Féin	Patrick McCartan	Unopposed	N/A	N/A

- Constituency abolished 1922
