= William Parsons =

William Parsons may refer to:

== Arts and entertainment ==
- William Parsons (composer and copyist) (fl.1545–1563), English Renaissance composer and copyist from Wells
- William Parsons (composer and musician) (1745/6–1817), Master of the King's Music
- William Parsons (poet) (died 1828), English writer associated with the Della Cruscan movement
- William Parsons (actor) (1736–1795), British actor and painter

== Sports ==
- William Parsons (footballer) (1877–?), Anglo-Spanish footballer
- Bill Parsons (born 1948), baseball player

== Nobleman ==
- Sir William Parsons, 1st Baronet of Langley (c.1636–c.1662), of the Parsons baronets
- Sir William Parsons, 1st Baronet of Bellamont (died 1650), surveyor general of Ireland and member of parliament
- Sir William Parsons, 2nd Baronet of Bellamont (died 1658), Earl of Rosse
- Sir William Parsons, 2nd Baronet of Birr Castle (1661–1741), Anglo-Irish politician
- Sir William Parsons, 4th Baronet of Birr Castle (1731–1791), Irish politician
- William Parsons, 3rd Earl of Rosse (1800–1867), Lord Rosse, Irish astronomer
- William Parsons, 5th Earl of Rosse (1873–1918), Irish peer and British Army officer
- Brendan Parsons, 7th Earl of Rosse (William Clere Leonard Brendan Parsons, born 1936), worked for the United Nations

== Others ==
- William Barclay Parsons (1859–1932), American civil engineer
- William E. Parsons (1872–1939), American architect and city planner
- William Sterling Parsons (1901–1953), American naval officer and atomic bomb weaponeer aboard Enola Gay
- William Parsons (surveyor) (1701–1757), English Surveyor-General of Pennsylvania Province, founder of Easton, Pennsylvania.
- William W. Parsons (academic administrator) (1850–1925), president of Indiana State Normal School, later known as Ball State University
- William W. Parsons (NASA), former director of the NASA John F. Kennedy Space Center, & Space Shuttle Program manager
- William Henry Parsons (New York activist) (died 1935), headed the New York Society for the Suppression of Vice
- William Henry Parsons (colonel) (1826–1907), American newspaper editor, legislator, and Confederate colonel
