= James King, 4th Baron Kingston =

English peer (1693–1761)

James King, 4th Baron Kingston (1693 – 26 December 1761) was a British member of the peerage. King was a prominent freemason, being the Grand Master of the Premier Grand Lodge of England for 1728–1730 and also Grand Master of the Grand Lodge of Ireland for 1731–1732 and 1735–1736. He was also a member of the Privy Council of Ireland. Despite being born in France to Jacobite parents, he was naturalised at the age of 13 years old on 8 January 1707 as a British subject and was a Protestant.

== Background ==
Born in France to John King, 3rd Baron Kingston and his wife Margaret O'Cahan, James' father had been a close supporter of king James II of England and following his overthrow fled in exile to France with him. His father was given a pardon on 3 September 1694 by the British government and the new regime in London, switching sides and eventually returning to the Kingdom of Ireland, where he would serve in the Irish House of Lords. The young James King petitioned for naturalisation on 8 January 1707, where he and his siblings were described as "born out of her Majesty's allegiance, but are good Protestants."

== Freemasonry ==
King was a prominent freemason; he was Grand Master of the Premier Grand Lodge of England for 1728—1730 and also Grand Master of the Grand Lodge of Ireland for 1731–1732 and 1735–1736. As well as his involvement in freemasonry in England and Ireland, he also was involved in freemasonry in France. King was an officer of Masonry in Lyon and was also active in Paris. He was a member of a Masonic lodge in Paris, which had Louis-Marie-Augustin d'Aumont, 4th Duke of Aumont (1709–1782), as its Grand Master and included notables such as James Waldegrave, 1st Earl Waldegrave (the Ambassador of Great Britain to France), Louis Phélypeaux, comte de Saint-Florentin (the Foreign Minister of France) and the Enlightenment philosopher Montesquieu.

Freemasonry during the early 18th century had somewhat of a Jacobite tinge to it, particularly in France and Ireland. In England, the supporters of the Hanoverians, particularly under Prime Minister Robert Walpole, had decided to move into freemasonry and make it their own, rather than attack it outright or suppress it, as well as this, abroad (especially in Paris) the Hanoverians and Jacobites spied on each other in the masonic lodges. Some persons within freemasonry, such as John Theophilus Desaguliers and James Anderson (author of The Constitutions of the Free-Masons in 1723) were happy to oblige with this Whiggish reorientation. In relation to France, around 1737, Cardinal André-Hercule de Fleury, the Chief Minister to Louis XV was looking to make peace with Walpole and Britain. The masonic lodges in France, founded mostly by Jacobite military exiles, were a threat to this deal and so de Fleury directed René Hérault to shut them down. He also pressed Pope Clement XII to issue a bull the following year condemning freemasonry.

It was into this complex interweaving drama that King became caught up in a significant controversy, which led to the revelation of Masonic rituals to the public in France with the publication of La réception d'un frey-maçon (1737) in La Gazette de Hollande. The police chief Hérault did not just use physical force against freemasonic lodges, but also sought to elicit intelligence by using the sexual services of certain women. Marie Armabade Carton, a dancer with the Paris Opera who had been a mistress to banker Samuel Demard and Marshal Maurice de Saxe, was used. King had previously seduced her daughter, causing the break-up of the marriage. Upon meeting King in Paris, Carton gave the impression that she was familiar with masonic secrets from past lovers and enticed King to demonstrate his knowledge for sexual favours. Any so-called "great secret" which Hérault and de Fleury sought, was not revealed but the rituals of the Craft were exposed to the public and published not only in French, but also the following year in The Gentleman's Magazine.

== Marriages ==
King married twice during his life. Firstly to Elizabeth Meade, daughter of Sir John Meade, 1st Baronet and his second wife Eleanor Redman of Ballylinch, and former wife of Ralph Freke, with whom he had three children; Margaret, William and Elizabeth King. Later, in July 1751, King married for a second time; this time to Isabella Ogle, daughter of Nathaniel Ogle. No children were born to this marriage. As King's son William died before him, the lands he controlled in County Cork, County Tipperary and County Limerick passed through his daughter Margaret, who was married to Richard FitzGerald. Eventually, the lands came back into the King family through the Earls of Kingston.

== Bibliography ==
- O'Sullivan, Eilís, Ascendancy Women and Elementary Education in Ireland: Educational Provision for Poor Children, 1788 - 1848 (2017)
- Peter, Robert, British Freemasonry, 1717–1813, Volume 5 (2016)

Masonic offices
Preceded by The Lord Coleraine	Grand Master of the Premier; Grand Lodge of England; 1728–1730	Succeeded by The Duke of Norfolk
Preceded by The Earl of Rosse	Grand Master of the Grand Lodge of Ireland; 1731–1732	Succeeded by The Viscount Netterville
Preceded by The Viscount Barnewall	Grand Master of the Grand Lodge of Ireland; 1735–1736	Succeeded by The Viscount Tyrone
Peerage of Ireland
Preceded by John King	Baron Kingston; 1728–1761	Extinct
