= Sir Laurence Parsons, 3rd Baronet =

Anglo-Irish politician

Sir Laurence Parsons, 3rd Baronet (1708 – 24 October 1756) was an Anglo-Irish politician.

Parsons was the son of William Parsons and Martha Pigott, and the grandson of Sir William Parsons, 2nd Baronet. His father predeceased his grandfather, and Parsons succeeded to his grandfather's baronetcy on 17 March 1741.

Between 1741 and his death, Parsons sat in the Irish House of Commons as the Member of Parliament for King's County.

He married, firstly, Mary Sprigge, daughter of William Sprigge, on 5 September 1730. He married, secondly, Anne Harman, daughter of Wentworth Harman and Frances Sheppard, on 16 February 1742. His son from his first marriage, William Parsons succeeded to his title in 1756, while a son from his second marriage, Laurence Parsons, was elevated to the peerage as Earl of Rosse in 1806.

Parliament of Ireland
Preceded by Colley Lyons; Sir William Parsons, Bt	Member of Parliament for King's County; 1741-1756; With: Trevor Lloyd (1741-1748); Henry Lyons (1748-1756)	Succeeded by Henry Lyons; Sir William Parsons, Bt
Baronetage of Ireland
Preceded by Laurence Parsons	Baronet (of Birr Castle); 1741-1756	Succeeded by William Parsons
