= Molesworth Street, Dublin =

Street in Dublin, Ireland

Molesworth Street
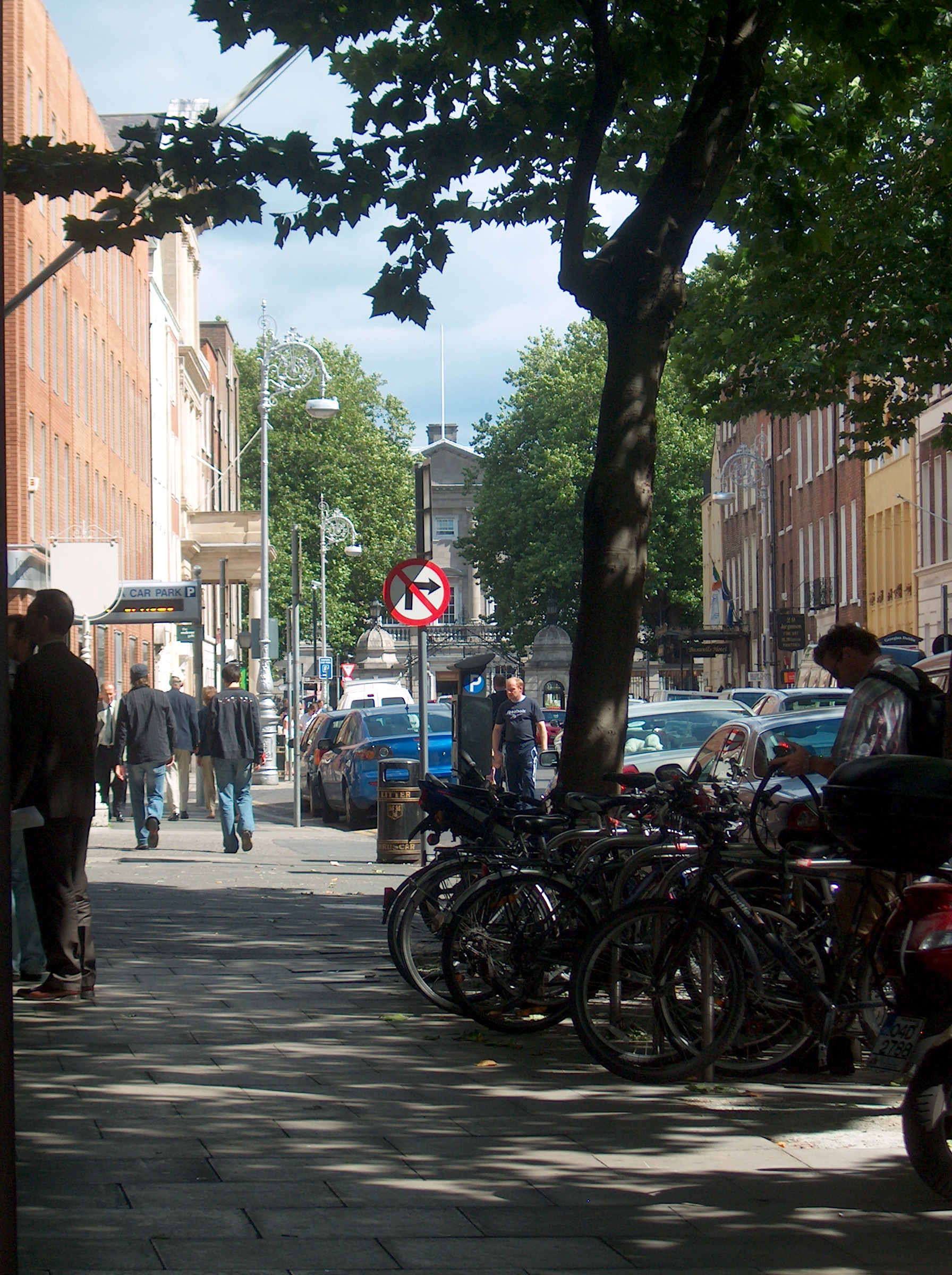
- A street scene on Molesworth Street, Dublin. Leinster House is partially visible in the background.
- Interactive map of Molesworth Street
- Native name: Sráid Theach Laighean (Irish)
- Namesake: Richard Molesworth, 3rd Viscount Molesworth
- Length: 200 m (660 ft)
- Width: 17 metres (56 ft)
- Location: Dublin, Ireland
- Postal code: D02
- Coordinates: 53°20′27.99″N 6°15′24.54″W
- west end: Dawson Street
- east end: Kildare Street

Other
- Known for: Georgian Dublin; Freemasons' Hall; Leinster House

Molesworth Street (Irish: Sráid Theach Laighean, meaning 'Leinster House Street') is a street in Dublin, Ireland named after Richard Molesworth, 3rd Viscount Molesworth which links Dawson Street with Kildare Street and lies just over 200 m from St. Stephens Green in Dublin's south city centre.

== History and environs ==
Molesworth Street is named after Richard Molesworth, 3rd Viscount Molesworth and was originally an area known as "Molesworth Fields" before being laid out as a street in the 1720s.

One of the most important buildings is Freemasons' Hall, home of the Grand Lodge of Ireland designed by the architect Edward Holmes of Birmingham and completed in 1866 on the site of the townhouse of the first grandmaster, the Earl of Rosse.

Buswells Hotel, which comprises three adjoining Georgian buildings, is frequented by politicians due to its proximity to Irish government buildings.

10 Molesworth Street was re-constructed around 2017 as a 10,860 m^{2} (116,900 sq ft) building and was the first to achieve a platinum LEED sustainability accreditation.

16 Molesworth Street is home to The Molesworth Gallery, a contemporary art gallery that hosts regular exhibitions by leading Irish and international artists.

Both houses of the Oireachtas are located in Leinster House, Kildare Street (adjacent to Molesworth Street).

== St Anne's Schools and Molesworth Hall ==
In 1857, numbers 38 to 44 of the street were the site of the building of the St Anne's School, replacing what had previously been a terrace of Queen Anne-style houses demolished sometime before 1843. The school's foundation stone was laid on 7 March 1857. Designed by architects Deane and Woodward, it was a freestanding building comprising the earliest adaptation of an early English architectural style in Dublin which became known as Victorian. Built of Portland, Calp, and Caen stone, with red brick, the building had horizontal bands of contrasting materials, which was very much the architectural fashion of the time. The adjoining also freestanding Molesworth hall was added later around 1867 after the death of Woodward.

The school, hall and an adjoining brick building in the manner of Frederick Darley were purchased by the property developer Patrick Gallagher. The Hall was the venue for the first staging of Riders to the Sea by John Millington Synge. Gallagher wanted to replace the buildings with an office block designed by Desmond FitzGerald. The planners wanted any new design to incorporate at least the historic facades, but as they were not listed for protection, this was not enforced. FitzGerald described the buildings as "decrepit business premises". Planning permission was granted to demolish the buildings in 1974, and Gallagher expanded the site by buying up a series of buildings between these two and the corner of Dawson Street. When the demolition of Molesworth Hall began in 1978, several groups, including from An Taisce and local architecture students, began a protest. In response, Gallagher threatened to lay off 300 workers, which ultimately resulted in work resuming. The EEC Commission and StanChart Bank were the first tenants of the new office block.

=== Gallery ===
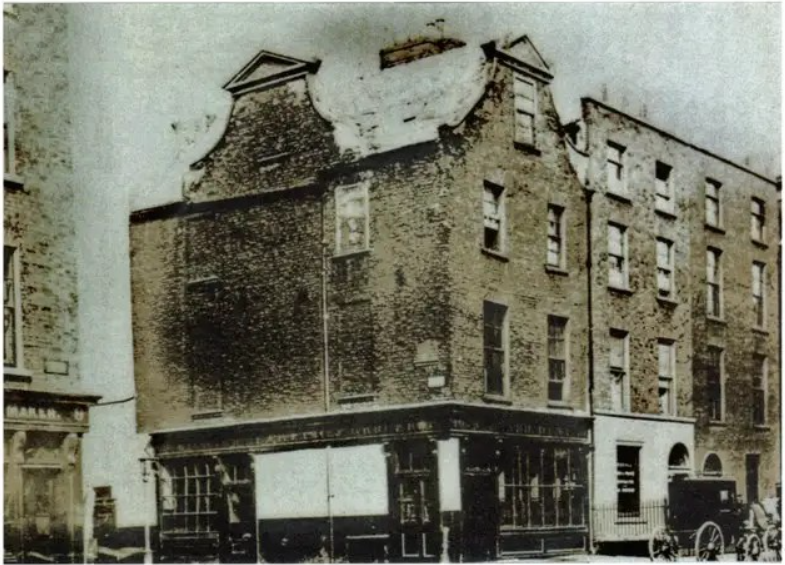
Richard Hunt's public house at the corner of 10 Molesworth Street and South Frederick Street

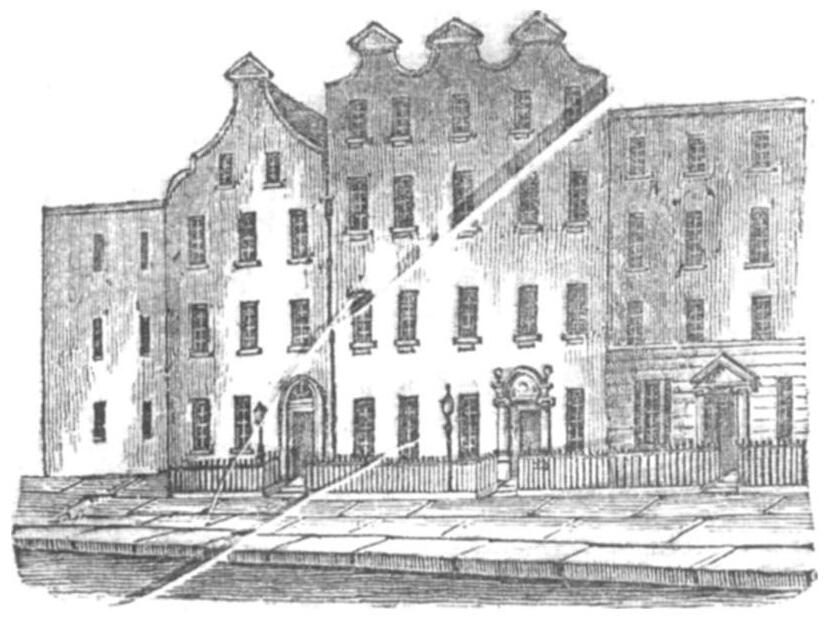
A view of houses on Molesworth Street from the Dublin Penney Journal of 1836 including that of John Foster (centre)

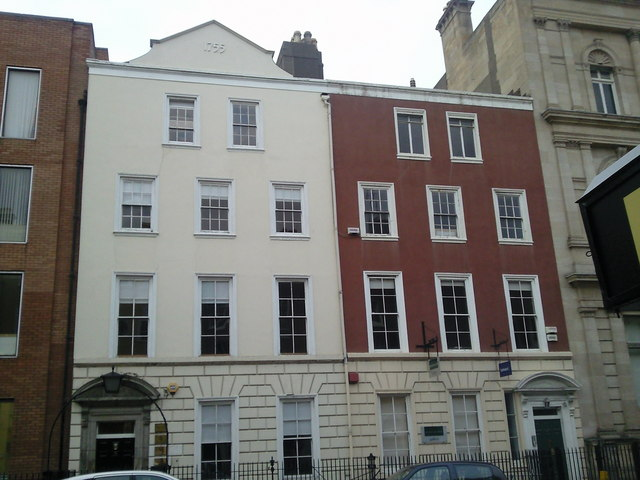
Georgian houses on Molesworth Street

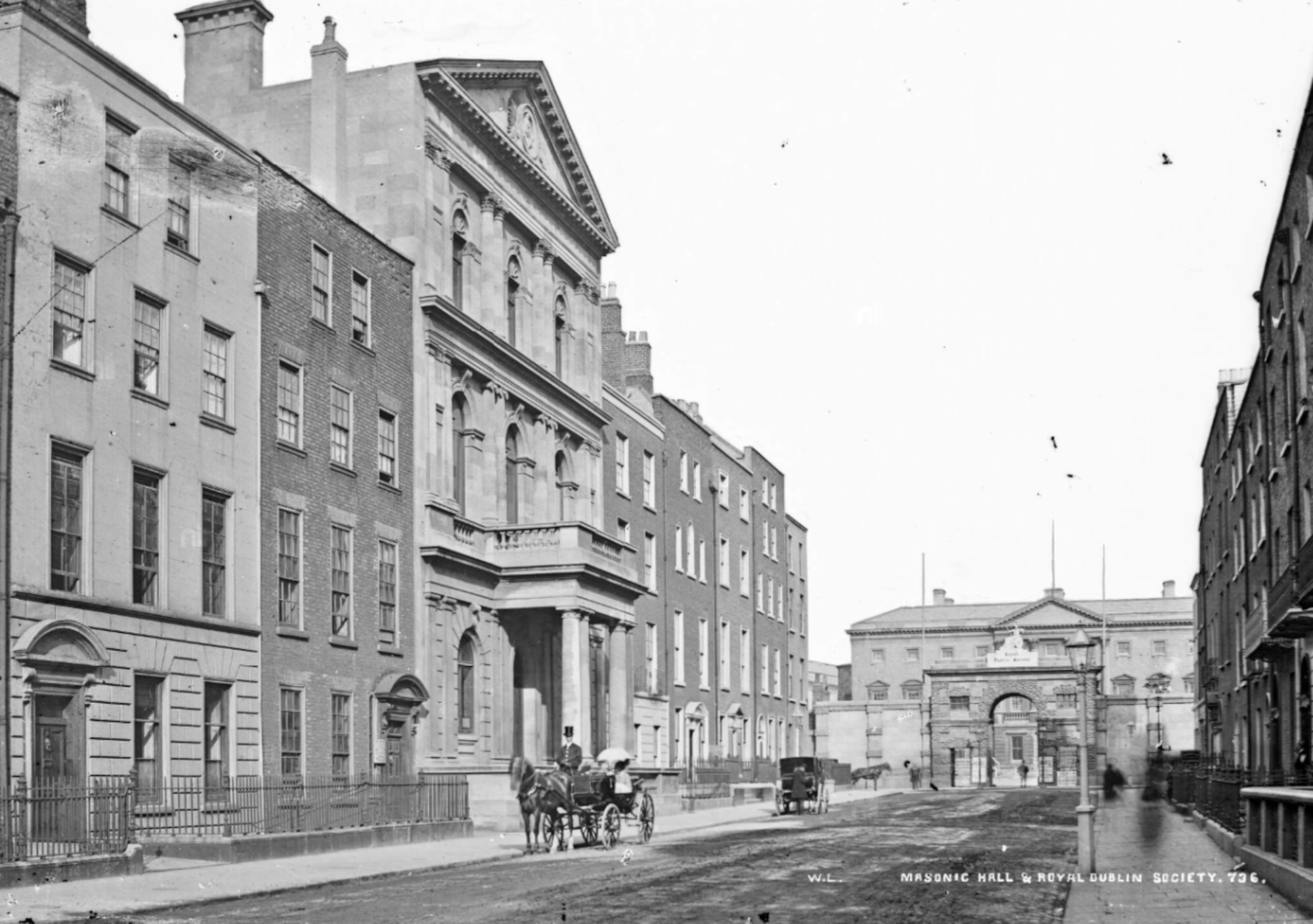
Masonic Hall & Royal Dublin Society c 1870

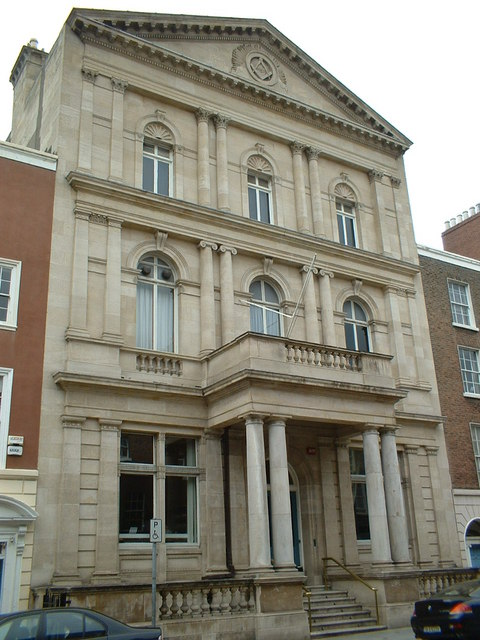
Freemasons' Hall built in place the Earl of Rosse's former townhouse

== Notable residents ==
- John Foster, 1st Baron Oriel
- Richard Parsons, 1st Earl of Rosse

== See also ==
- List of streets and squares in Dublin
