= Earl of Charleville =

Title in the Peerage of Ireland

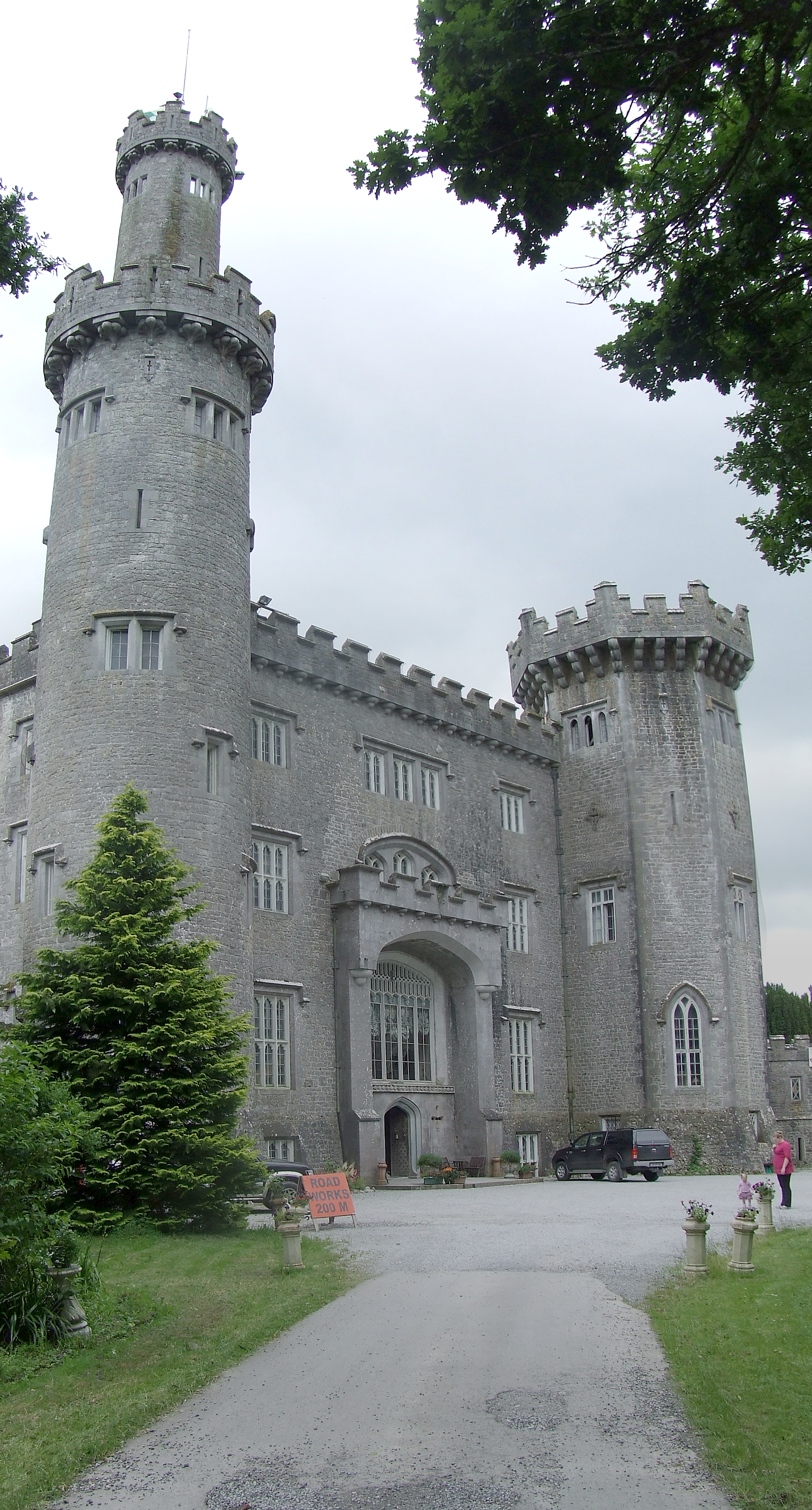
Charleville Castle, the seat of the Moore and Bury families.

Earl of Charleville was a title that was created twice in the Peerage of Ireland. The first creation came in 1758 when Charles Moore, 2nd Baron Moore, was made Earl of Charleville, in the King's County. The title Baron Moore, of Tullamore in the King's County, was created in the Peerage of Ireland in 1715 for his father John Moore, who had previously represented King's County in the Irish House of Commons. Lord Charleville was childless and the titles became extinct on his death in 1764.

The second creation came in the Peerage of Ireland in 1806 in favour of Charles Bury, 1st Viscount Charleville. He had already been created Baron Tullamore, of Charleville Forest in the King's County, in 1797, and Viscount Charleville, of Charleville Forest in the King's County, in 1800, also in the Peerage of Ireland. Lord Charleville was the grandson of William Bury and the Honourable Jane Moore, daughter of the first Baron Moore and sister of the first Earl of the first creation. His father John Moore had succeeded to the Charleville estates on the death of his maternal uncle in 1764. In 1801 Lord Charleville was elected an Irish representative peer. He was succeeded by his son, the second Earl. He was a Tory politician and sat as an Irish Representative Peer between 1838 and 1851. The title descended from father to son until the early death of his grandson, the fourth Earl, in 1874. The late Earl was succeeded by his uncle, the fifth Earl. The fifth Earl was childless and on his death in 1875 the titles became extinct.

Lady Emily Alfreda Julia Bury, daughter of the third Earl, married Kenneth Howard, son of the Honourable James Howard. She succeeded to the Charleville estates, Charleville Castle, on the death of her brother the fifth Earl in 1875 and in 1881 she and her husband assumed by Royal licence the additional surname of Bury. Their son was the explorer and Conservative politician Charles Howard-Bury.

== Barons Moore (1715) ==
- John Moore, 1st Baron Moore (died 1725)
- Charles Moore, 2nd Baron Moore (1712–1764) (created Earl of Charleville in 1758)

== Earls of Charleville; First creation (1758) ==
- Charles Moore, 1st Earl of Charleville (1712–1764)

== Earls of Charleville; Second creation (1806) ==
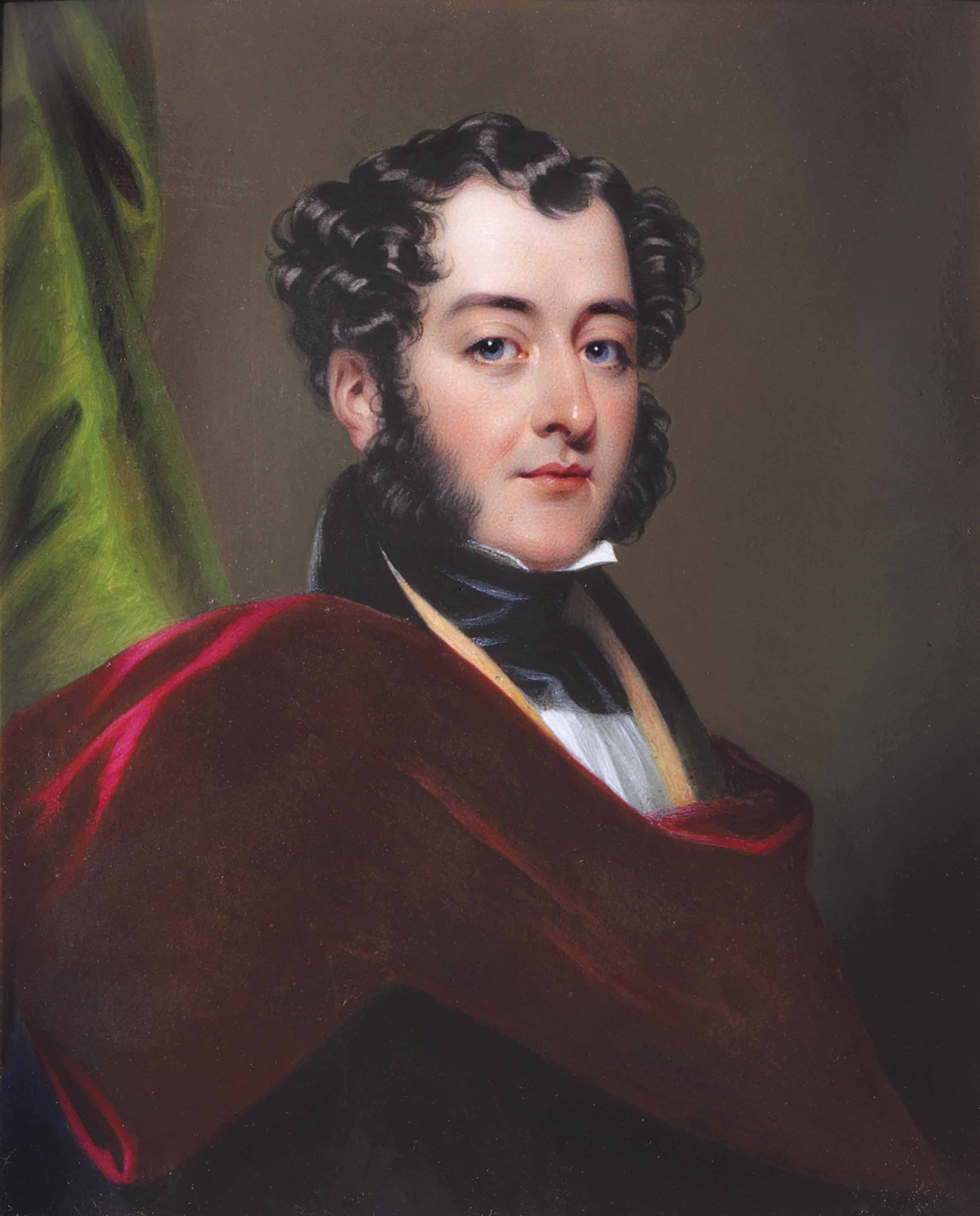
Charles William Bury, 2nd Earl of Charleville, portrait by Henry Pierce Bone, 1835.

- Charles William Bury, 1st Earl of Charleville (1764–1835)
- Charles William Bury, 2nd Earl of Charleville (1801–1851)
- Charles William George Bury, 3rd Earl of Charleville (1822–1859)
- Charles William Francis Bury, 4th Earl of Charleville (1852–1874)
- Alfred Bury, 5th Earl of Charleville (1829–1875)
