= St Martin's Church, Womersley =

Church in Womersley, North Yorkshire, England

Coordinates: 53.6647°N 1.1961°W

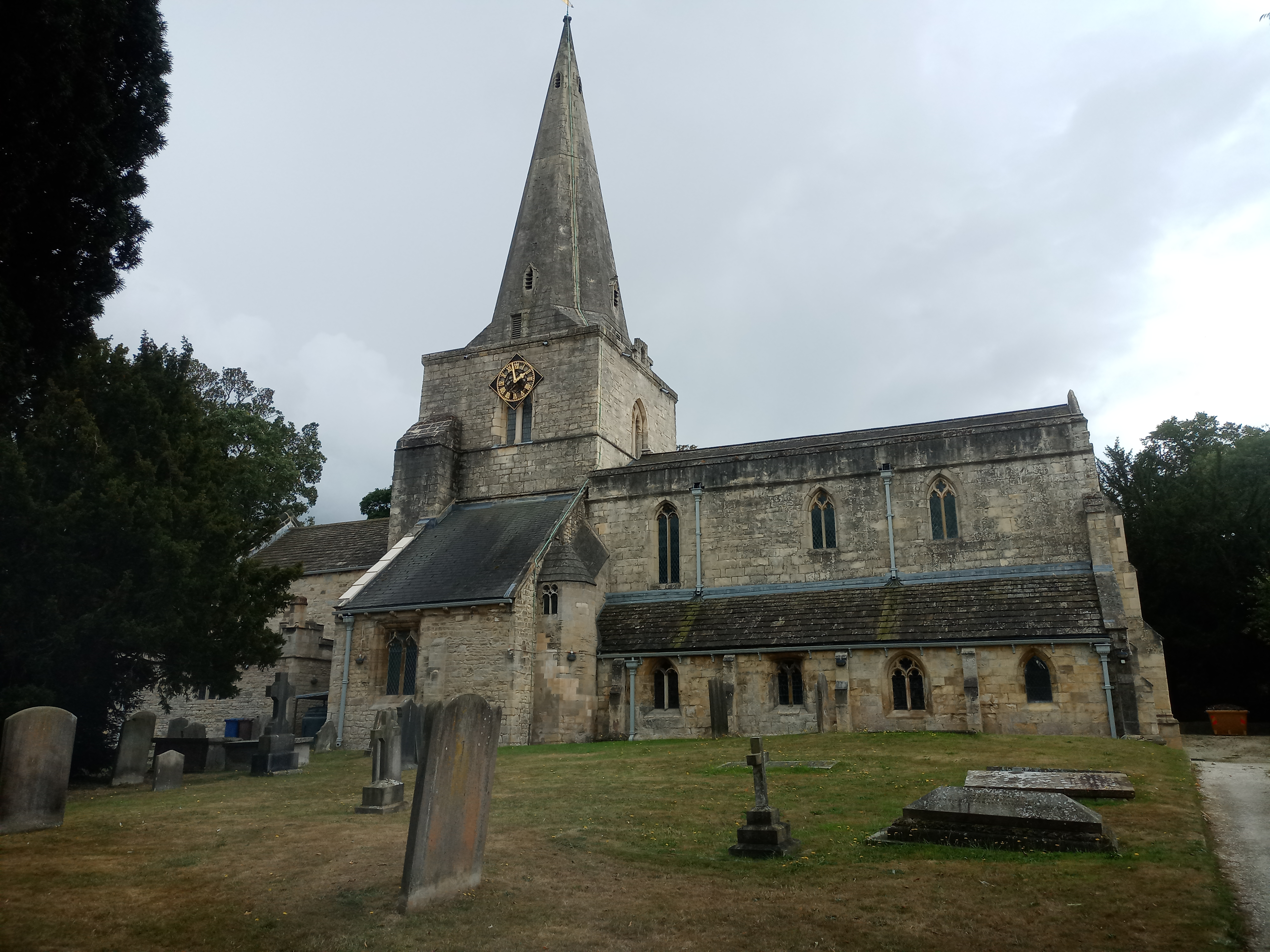
The church, in 2025

St Martin's Church is the parish church of Womersley, a village in North Yorkshire, in England.

A church in Womersley was recorded in the Domesday Book, but the oldest part of the current building is part of the north arcade, dating from the 12th century. The nave and remainder of the north aisle are 13th century, while the south aisle, porch, transepts and tower were added in the 14th century. The building was further altered in the 15th, 18th and 19th centuries, the work including the addition of a vestry and rebuilding of the chancel. The building was restored by William Henry Crossland in 1867, who lowered the floor, removed a gallery, and installed an organ. From 1893 to 1894, it was further restored by George Frederick Bodley and Thomas Garner. In 1900, Thomas Kensit of the Protestant Truth Society stole the statues from the rood screen to protest what he believed was a Catholic influence on them, though they were quickly recovered. The building was grade I listed in 1967.

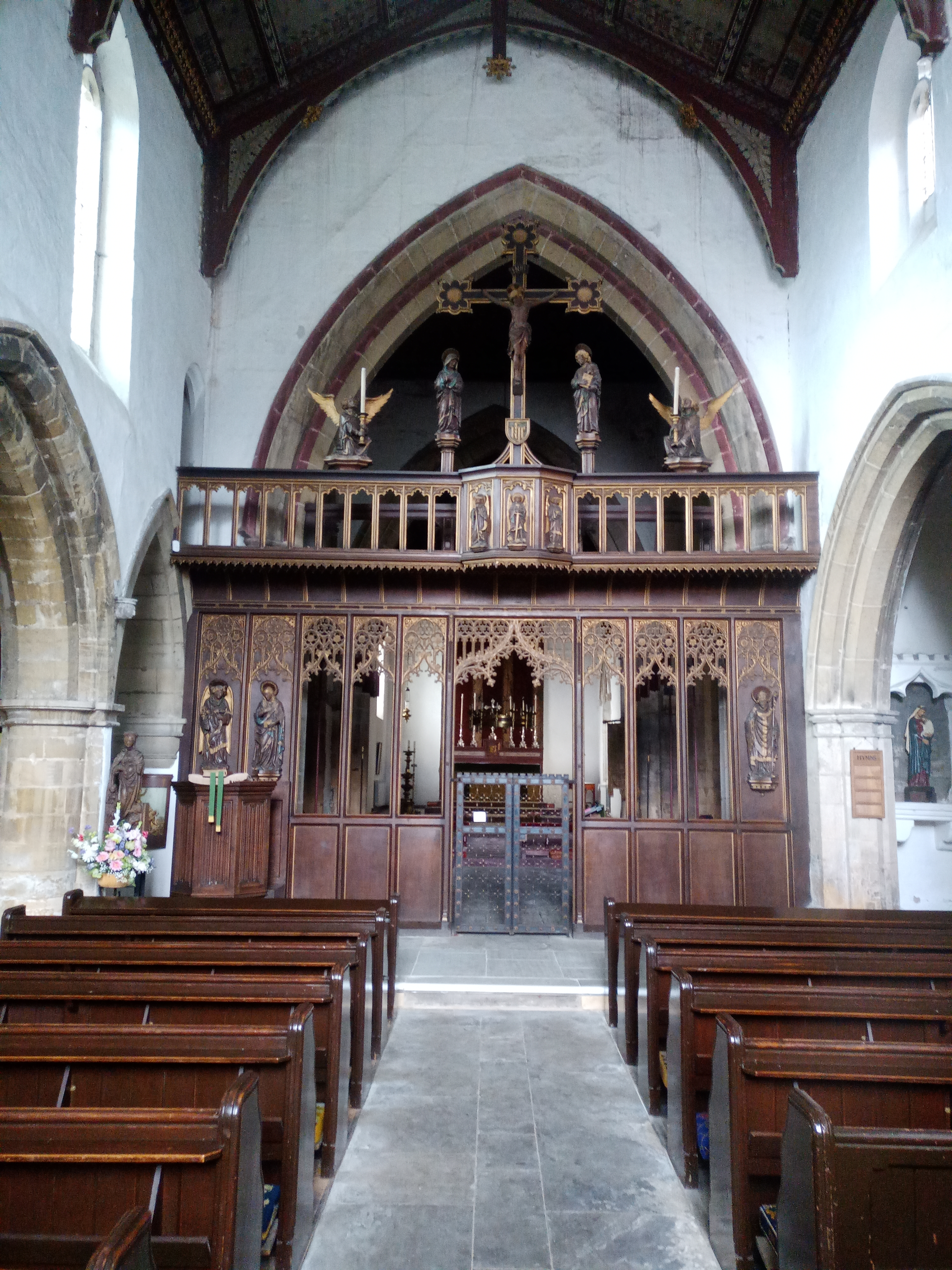
View east in the church

The church is built of magnesian limestone with roofs of red tile, grey slate and stone slate. It has a cruciform plan, consisting of a nave with a clerestory, north and south aisles, a south porch, north and south transepts, a chancel with a north vestry, and a steeple at the crossing. The steeple has a tower with a north buttress, an octagonal stair turret, a sill band, clock faces, two-light bell openings, and a broach spire.

Inside the church is a large rood screen, designed by Bodley, while the monuments include an effigy believed to depict Adam de Newmarch, who died in 1287. There is an early 17th-century wall hanging of the Last Supper, made in Spain and brought to the church in the late 19th century. Two of the stained glass windows are by Charles Eamer Kempe.

== See also ==
- Grade I listed buildings in North Yorkshire (district)
- Listed buildings in Womersley
