= Grand Lodge of Ireland =

Second most senior Grand Lodge of Freemasons

Grand Lodge of Ancient, Free & Accepted Masons of Ireland
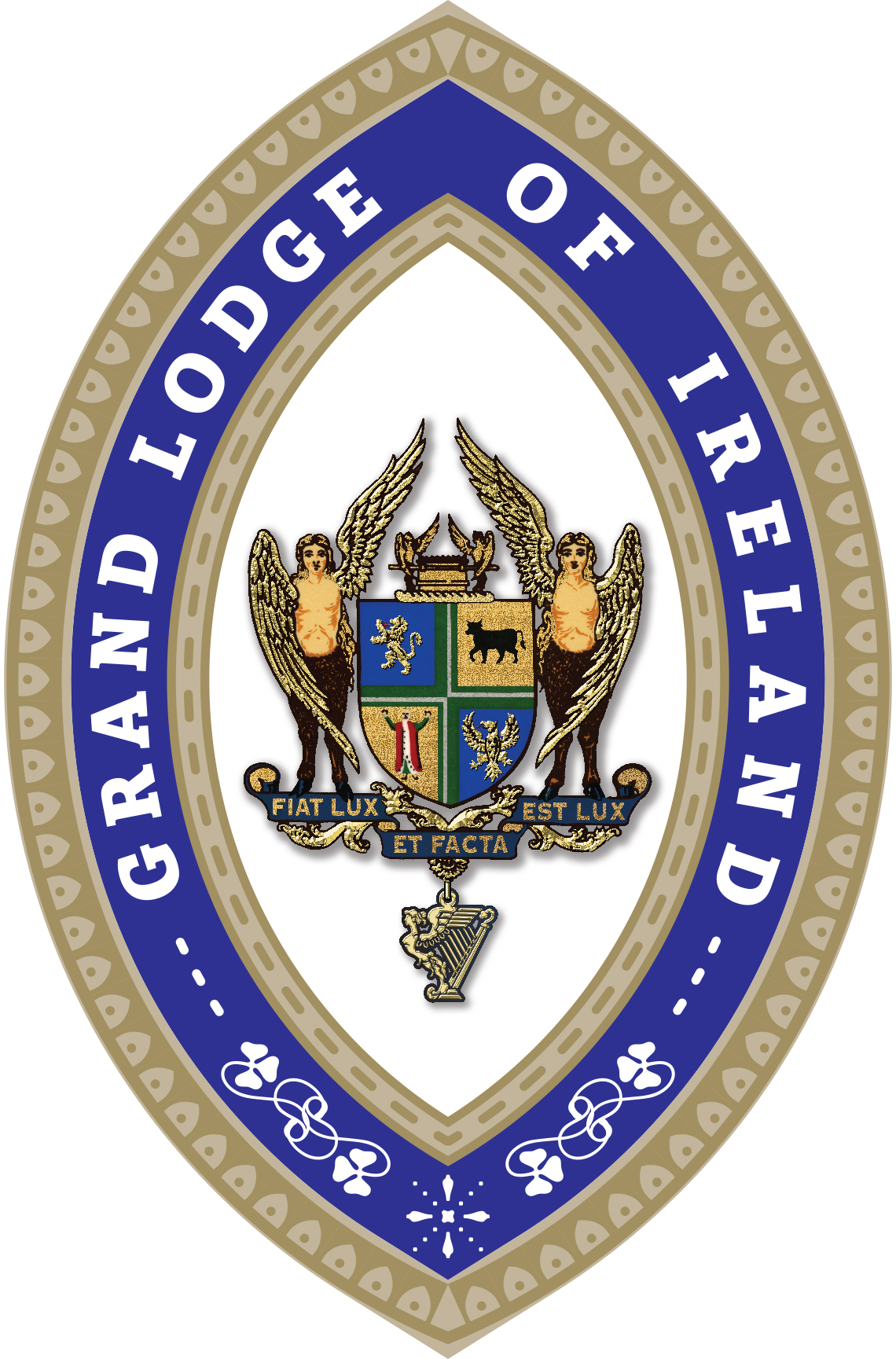
- Arms of the Grand Lodge of Ireland
- Established: Before 1725; 301 years ago
- Location: Ireland; Dublin
- Region served: Ireland
- Website: freemasons.ie

The Grand Lodge of Ireland is the second most senior Grand Lodge of Freemasons in the world. Since no specific record of its foundation exists, 1725 is the year celebrated in Grand Lodge anniversaries, as the oldest reference to Grand Lodge of Ireland comes from the Dublin Weekly Journal of 26 June 1725. This describes a meeting of the Grand Lodge to install the new Grand Master, The 1st Earl of Rosse, on 24 June. The Grand Lodge has regular Masonic jurisdiction over 13 Provincial Grand Lodges covering all the Freemasons of the island of Ireland, and another 11 provinces worldwide. Although there are some artefacts which suggest the existence of freemasonry in Ireland prior to this date, namely a chair with Masonic symbols and the Irish harp in Lurgan Masonic hall dated 1681.

== History ==
There is considerable evidence of Masonic Lodges meeting in Ireland prior to the 18th century. The story of the "Lady Freemason," Elizabeth St. Leger, dates to a time prior to the existence of the Grand Lodge; also, there are references to Lodge meetings across Dublin in a speech given in Trinity College Dublin, as far back as 1688. The oldest artefact of Fraternal Masonry in Ireland, and one of the oldest masonic artefacts in the world, is Baal's Bridge Square, on which the date 1507 is inscribed. The brass square was recovered from Baal's Bridge in Limerick during reconstruction in 1830, and appeared to have been deliberately placed under the foundation stone of the old bridge. It is inscribed with the phrase, "I will strive to live with love and care, upon the level and by the square."

According to the Dublin Weekly Journal, The 1st Earl of Rosse was elected as the new Grand Master of the Grand Lodge of Ireland on 26 June 1725. The attendant procession included the Masters and Wardens of six lodges of "Gentleman Freemasons". The article has the strong implication that this was not the first such election, but since no earlier reference has yet been found, the Grand Lodge of Ireland dates its foundation to 1725, making it the second oldest, and the oldest extant Grand Lodge in the World. At least as early as 1726, there was also a Grand Lodge to the South, in Munster, which was absorbed by the Dublin Grand Lodge in 1733.

The Irish Grand Lodge was the first to issue warrants to lodges in their present form, and, unlike the other Grand Lodges in London and Edinburgh, had no problems in issuing warrants for travelling lodges. Thus it was that the majority of masonic lodges in the British Army, wherever they came from, were warranted under the Irish Constitution. The form of masonry that the British Army spread in the colonies was predominantly Irish. It was an English regiment with an Irish warrant that started the lodge from which Prince Hall Freemasonry sprang.

In England, it was Irish Freemasons who set up a rival to the Premier Grand Lodge of England, in the form of the Grand Lodge of England which we now call the Antients. The Grand Secretary of the Antients, Laurence Dermott, based his regulations on Spratt's Irish constitutions. It was the Antients' ritual form that prevailed when the two rival English Grand Lodges joined in 1813.

The early nineteenth century brought a series of setbacks for the Grand Lodge of Ireland. A dispute over the higher degrees led to a breakaway Grand Lodge of Ulster, operating from 1805 for nine years. The Irish Famine of 1823 caused unrest, in which some lodges became centres of Republican activity, and Irish Freemasonry was briefly proscribed by the Government until 1825. In 1826, the papal condemnation Quo Graviora, although only the latest of a series of anti-masonic measures by the Church, was the first to be rigidly enforced by the Irish clergy. Many Catholic Freemasons were threatened with excommunication, and resigned as a result.

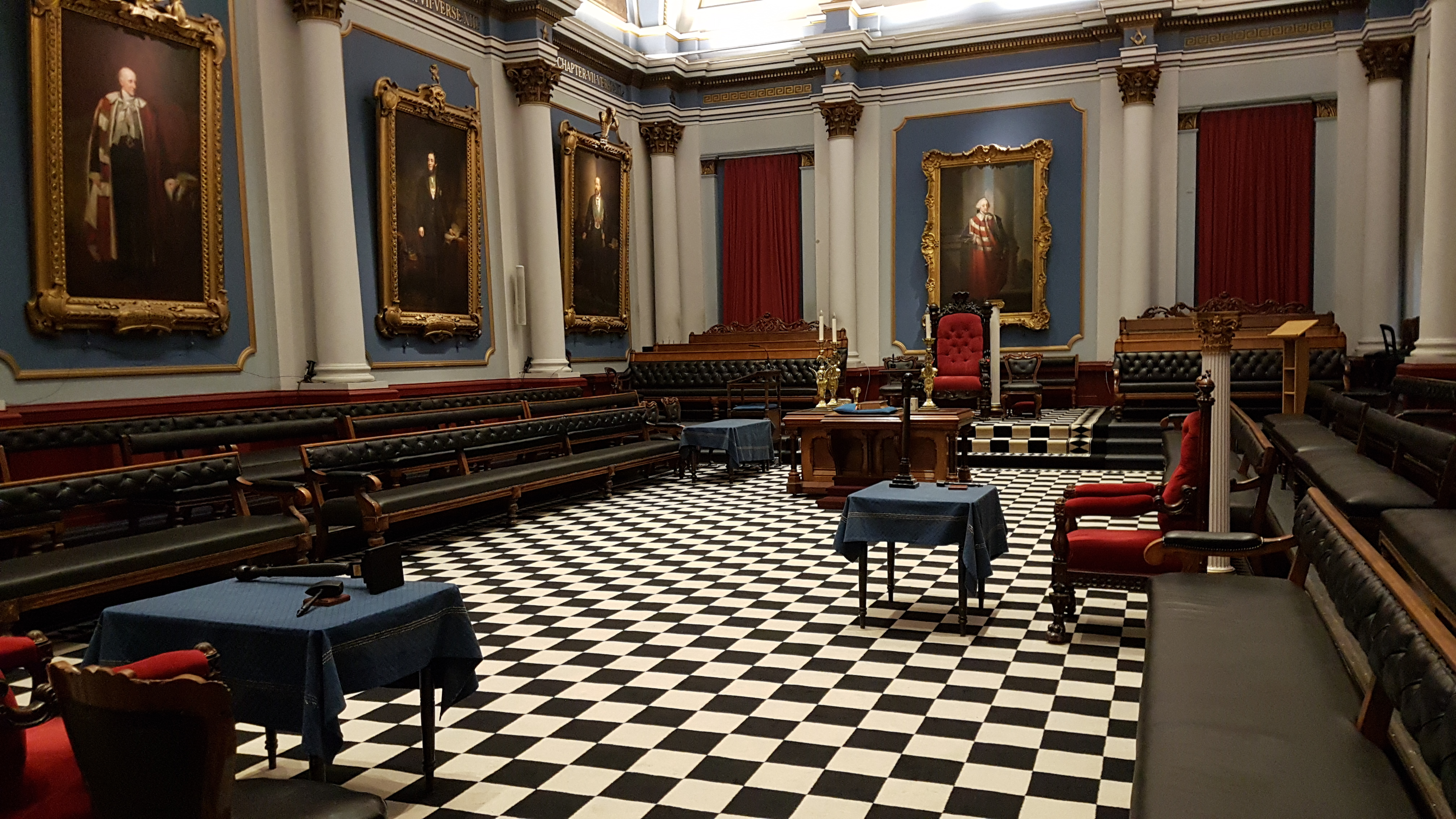
The Grand Lodge of Ireland, Dublin.

During the 18th century, individual Lodges had met at inns, taverns and coffee houses, while the meetings of the Grand Lodge generally took place in civic and guild buildings. During the early 19th century Grand Lodge began leasing buildings as semi-permanent Masonic facilities, for example, the Grand Lodge for a time held residence at No. 19, Dawson Street in Dublin which is the current home of the Royal Irish Academy. From Dawson Street, the Grand Lodge moved to Commercial Buildings on Dame Street until Grand Lodge along with most Metropolitan Lodges moved to a new, purpose-built facility on Molesworth Street. In 1869 the current, purpose-built headquarters of Irish Freemasonry, Freemasons' Hall on Molesworth Street, opened, housing dramatically decorated Lodge rooms, a library, museum, offices and dining areas.

In 2000 the Grand Lodge counted more than 700 centres and 33,000 Irish affiliated members, besides to other 150 lodges distributed abroad the island.

On 31 December 2021 a fire was reported in the Masonic Lodge on Molesworth Street. The incident happened at 17:20 and the fire was extinguished shortly after 18:00. A man in his 30s was taken to St. James's Hospital with serious injuries. Firefighters contained damage to one room and extinguished flames. On 1 January 2022 Gardaí issued an appeal for information after criminal damage and burglary.

== British Army lodges ==
The Grand Lodge of Ireland played a central role in the spread of military-based masonic lodges from the 18th century onwards. Initially, the Premier Grand Lodge of England were opposed to issuing "travelling warrants" to lodges and did not always consider soldiers men of "moral standing and order", so for regiments interested in forming a masonic lodge, it was easier to apply to the Grand Lodge of Ireland or later the Grand Lodge of Scotland for warrants. Between 1732 and 1742, the Grand Lodge of Ireland issued warrants to the following British Army regiments; 1st Regiment of Foot (Royal Scots), 17th (Leicestershire), 18th (Royal Irish), 19th (Green Howards), 20th Lancashire Fusiliers, 27th (Royal Inniskilling Fusiliers), 28th (Gloucestershire), 30th (East Lancashire), 32nd (Duke of Cornwalls Light Infantry), 33rd (West Riding (Duke of Wellington’s), 38th (South Staffords) and the 39th (Dorset). Following these early examples, the Grand Lodges of Ireland, Scotland and the Antient Grand Lodge of England issued hundreds of warrants for masonic lodges to the cavalry, infantry, artillery and militias. To this day there are two active masonic lodges of the British Army under the Grand Lodge of Ireland; No 322 Lodge Glittering Star of the Mercian Regiment and No 295 St Patrick’s of the Royal Dragoon Guards.

== Opposition ==
The Catholic Church excluded its members from participation in Freemasonry, rival movements such as the Knights of Saint Columbanus were created and particularly during the 20th century as the Irish Free State was founded, the two groups were competitors. Some of the most vocal anti-masons in Ireland have typically been supporters of the Catholic Church and have authored works against freemasonry. This includes Michael de Gargano's (a pseudonym) Irish and English Freemasons and Their Foreign Brothers (1876), Fr. George F. Dillon's War of Anti-Christ with the Church and Christian Civilization (1885), Fr. Edward Cahill's Freemasonry and the anti-Christian Movement (1929) and Fr. Denis Fahey who reprinted Fr. Dillon's work in 1950, as well as the encyclicals of Pope Leo XIII.

== Provincial Grand Lodges in Ireland ==
- Antrim
- Armagh
- North Connaught
- South Connaught
- Down
- Londonderry & Donegal
- Meath
- Metropolitan Area
- Midland Counties
- Munster
- North Munster
- South Eastern
- Tyrone & Fermanagh
- Wicklow & Wexford

== Provincial Grand Lodges Overseas ==
- Bermuda
- Far East
- India
- Jamaica, Cayman Islands and the Bahamas
- Natal
- New Zealand
- South Africa Northern, Southern Cape
- South East Asia (Singapore, Malaysia and Thailand)
- Southern Cape
- Sri Lanka
- Zambia

There are additionally several overseas lodges not attached to provinces, and two travelling lodges attached to British Army regiments.

== Grand Masters ==
Election	Name
1725	The 1st Earl of Rosse
1731	The 4th Baron Kingston
1732	The 5th Viscount Netterville
1733	The 4th Viscount Barnewall (sometimes informally known as Lord Kingsland)
1735	The 4th Baron Kingston
1736	The 1st Viscount Tyrone (later Earl of Tyrone)
1738	The 3rd Viscount Mountjoy
1740	The 3rd Viscount Doneraile
1741	The 2nd Baron Moore
1743	The 2nd Baron Southwell
1744	The 3rd Viscount Allen
1747	Sir Marmaduke Wyvill, 6th Bt
1749	The 1st Baron Kingsborough
1751	Lord George Sackville (later Viscount Sackville)
1753	The Hon. Thomas George Southwell
1757	Brinsley, Lord Newtown-Butler
1758	The 6th Earl of Drogheda
1760	The 1st Earl of Charleville
1761	Sir Edward King, 5th Bt
1763	The 6th Earl of Westmeath
1767	The 5th Earl of Cavan
1769	The 1st Earl of Kingston
1770	William, Marquess of Kildare
1772	Randal, Viscount Dunluce
1774	The 2nd Earl of Belvedere
1776	The 1st Earl of Mornington
1777	The 2nd Duke of Leinster
1778	The 6th Earl of Antrim
1782	The 2nd Earl of Mornington
1783	The 1st Baron Muskerry
1785	Arthur, Viscount Kilwarlin
1787	The 2nd Viscount Glerawley (later Earl Annesley)
1789	The 2nd Baron Donoughmore
1813	The 3rd Duke of Leinster
1874	The 1st Duke of Abercorn
1886	The 2nd Duke of Abercorn
1913	The 6th Earl of Donoughmore
1948	Raymond Frederick Brooke
1964	The 7th Earl of Donoughmore
1981	The 7th Marquess of Donegall
1992	Darwin Herbert Templeton
2001	Eric Noel Waller
2006	George Dunlop
2014	Douglas T. Grey
2023	Rodney L. McCurley
2025	Richard S.G. Ensor

== See also ==
- Masonic Boys School, Dublin
- Masonic Female Orphan School of Ireland
