= John Moore, 1st Baron Moore =

Irish politician

John Moore, 1st Baron Moore PC (c. 1676 – 8 September 1725), was an Irish politician.

Moore was the son of Thomas Moore and Ellen Colley, daughter of Dudley Cowley, Member of Parliament for Philipstown. He was returned to the Irish Parliament for Philipstown in 1703, a seat he held until 1713, and then represented King's County between 1713 and 1715. He was sworn of the Irish Privy Council in August 1715 and raised to the Peerage of Ireland as Baron Moore, of Tullamore in the King's County, in October of the same year.

Lord Moore married firstly Mary Lum, daughter of Elnathan Lum, in 1697. After his first wife's death he married secondly Elizabeth Sankey, daughter of John Sankey. He died in September 1725 and was succeeded in the barony by his son from his first marriage, Charles, who was created Earl of Charleville in 1758.

Parliament of Ireland
Preceded by John Lovett; Duke Giffard	Member of Parliament for Philipstown; 1703–1713; With: George Monck	Succeeded by John Forster; James Peppard
Preceded by Sir William Parsons, Bt; William Purefoy	Member of Parliament for King's County; 1713–1715; With: James Forth	Succeeded by William Purefoy; Sir William Parsons, Bt
Peerage of Ireland
New creation	Baron Moore; 1715–1725	Succeeded by Charles Moore
