= Listed buildings in Womersley =

Womersley is a civil parish in the county of North Yorkshire, England. It contains ten listed buildings that are recorded in the National Heritage List for England. Of these, one is listed at Grade I, the highest of the three grades, one is at Grade II*, the middle grade, and the others are at Grade II, the lowest grade. The parish contains the village of Womersley and the surrounding area. All the listed buildings are in the village, and consist of a country house and associated structures, smaller houses, farm houses and farm buildings, a church, a village cross, and a water pump and trough.

== Key ==
Grade	Criteria
I	Buildings of exceptional interest, sometimes considered to be internationally important
II*	Particularly important buildings of more than special interest
II	Buildings of national importance and special interest

== Buildings ==
Name and location	Photograph	Date	Notes	Grade
St Martin's Church; 53.66466°N 1.19601°W		12th century	The church has been altered and extended through the centuries, including restorations by W. H. Crossland in 1867–68, and by Bodley and Garner in 1893–94. It is built in magnesian limestone with roofs of red tile, grey slate and stone slate. The church has a cruciform plan, consisting of a nave with a clerestory, north and south aisles, a south porch, north and south transepts, a chancel with a north vestry, and a steeple at the crossing. The steeple has a tower with a north buttress, an octagonal stair turret, a sill band, clock faces, two-light bell openings, and a broach spire.	I
Village Cross; 53.66742°N 1.20202°W		Medieval	The remains of the village cross are in magnesian limestone and are about 0.75 metres (2 ft 6 in) in height. They consist of a square plinth tapering to an octagonal base, and a stump of the cross shaft.	II
Womersley Park, coach house and stables 53.66467°N 1.19494°W		17th century	A small country house that has been extended and altered. It is in magnesian limestone, mainly rendered, with dressings in brick and stone, and hipped Welsh slate roofs. There is a U-shaped plan, with a main range of two storeys and attics, seven bays, and flanking projecting two-storey wings ending in canted bay windows. In the centre is a Doric portico with engaged pilasters, a frieze and a pediment. The windows are sashes in architraves with moulded sills. Above are a moulded cornice, a parapet and roof dormers. On the west front is a round-arched doorway with Doric pilasters and a divided fanlight. The coach house and stable range form an inverted U-shaped plan to the northwest. The main range has two storeys and six bays, and contains a carriage entrance with a segmental arch and a quoined surround.	II*
Low Farmhouse; 53.66569°N 1.19924°W		Late 17th century (probable)	The farmhouse is in magnesian limestone with dressings in stone and brick, quoins, and a roof in stone slate and pantile. There are two storeys and two bays, and a rear range. In the centre is a porch, and the windows are sashes, those on the ground floor with quoined jambs and cambered heads, and those on the upper floor with soldier arches. On the left gable end are the remains of mullioned windows.	II
Went Farmhouse; 53.66549°N 1.19872°W	—	Late 17th century (probable)	The farmhouse is in magnesian limestone, with stone dressings, and a swept pantile roof with stone slates to the eaves, moulded kneelers and stone copings. There are two storeys, four bays and rear outshuts. On the front is a doorway, above which is a single-light window, and the other windows are two-light casements, most with double-chamfered surrounds. On the right gable end is a mullioned window.	II
Dovecote, Low Farmhouse; 53.66583°N 1.19909°W	—	c. 1700	The dovecote is in magnesian limestone with dressings in stone, the west gable rendered, and it has a roof in stone slate and pantile with coped gables and moulded kneelers. There are three storeys and one bay. On the ground floor is a doorway, above it is a loading door, and the top floor has a continuous flight perch.	II
Manor House; 53.66483°N 1.19138°W	—	c. 1700 (probable)	The house is in magnesian limestone, with quoins, and a pantile roof with two courses of stone slate, stone copings and kneelers. There are two storeys, five bays and a lower two-storey single-bay to the left. The original entrance, now blocked, has quoined jambs, and the windows are mullioned with two or three lights.	II
Gate piers and wall, Womersley Park; 53.66512°N 1.19456°W	—	Early 18th century (probable)	The wall is in magnesian limestone and pinkish-brown brick, with dressings in stone and capstones. The gate piers project slightly and each has a square frieze and a cornice surmounted by an obelisk. There is an entrance with an elliptical arch, and an infilled entrance with a double segmental arch. The wall contains blocked elliptical openings for the heating system.	II
Pigeoncote, Home Farm; 53.66426°N 1.19102°W	—	Mid to late 18th century	The pigeoncote is in pinkish-brown brick, with stone dressings, a floor band, a moulded cornice, and a hipped pantile roof. There are two storeys and one bay, and a square plan. It contains segmental-arched openings, some blocked, a pitching door, a door with a divided fanlight, and a window. Inside, there are brick nesting boxes on the upper floor.	II
Village pump and trough 53.66743°N 1.20200°W		1842	The pump is in cast iron and is about 2 metres (6 ft 7 in) in height. It has a cylindrical shaft with spouts at two levels and a handle, and the trough is oblong.	II
