= Womersley =

Village in North Yorkshire, England

Coordinates: 53°39′56″N 1°11′52″W

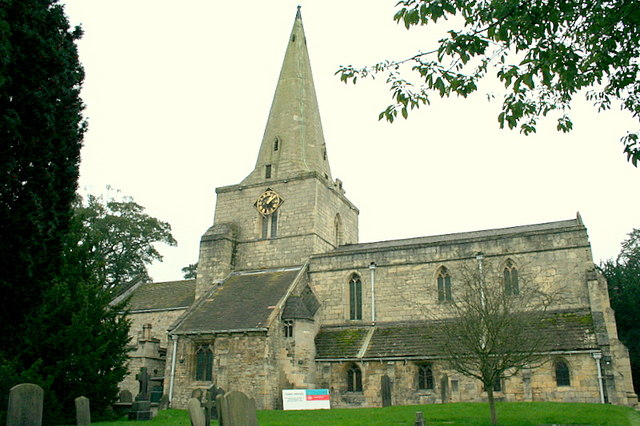
- St Martin's Church

- Location within North Yorkshire
- Population: 363 (2001 census)
- OS grid reference: SE531419
- Unitary authority: North Yorkshire
- Ceremonial county: North Yorkshire
- Region: Yorkshire and the Humber
- Country: England
- Sovereign state: United Kingdom
- Post town: DONCASTER
- Postcode district: DN6
- Dialling code: 01977
- Police: North Yorkshire
- Fire: North Yorkshire
- Ambulance: Yorkshire
- UK Parliament: Selby

Womersley is a village and civil parish in North Yorkshire, England. In 2001 the parish had a population of 363. The parish population at the 2011 census (including Stapleton and Walden Stubbs) was 515. It is near the towns of Selby, Askern and Pontefract. It is close to the borders with South and West Yorkshire.

The Grade II* listed Womersley Park house lies in the village. In the mid-18th century, its main street was diverted to provide more privacy for the house.

The village was part of the West Riding of Yorkshire until 1974. From 1974 to 2023 it was part of the Selby District. It is now administered by the unitary North Yorkshire Council.

The name Womersley derives from the Old English Wilmaerslēah meaning 'Wilmaer's wood/clearing'.

== Amenities ==
St Martin's Church, Womersley is a Grade I listed building.

== See also ==
- Listed buildings in Womersley
