= Lawrence Parsons (judge) =

English-born Irish judge

Sir Lawrence Parsons (died 1628) was an English-born barrister, judge and politician in seventeenth-century Ireland, who enjoyed a highly successful career, despite frequent accusations of corruption and neglect of official duty. His success owed much to the patronage of his uncle Sir Geoffrey Fenton, of his cousin by marriage Richard Boyle, 1st Earl of Cork, and of the prime Royal favourite, the Duke of Buckingham. He was the ancestor of the Earl of Rosse of the second creation. He rebuilt Birr Castle, which is still the Parsons family home.

== Early career ==
He was born in Leicestershire, a younger son of James Parsons and Catherine Fenton, daughter of Henry Fenton of Sturton le Steeple and his wife Cicely Beaumont of Coleorton Hall, and sister of Sir Geoffrey Fenton and the navigator Edward Fenton.

With two of his brothers, of whom the more eminent was Sir William Parsons, 1st Baronet of Bellamont, he came to Ireland in the entourage of his uncle Sir Geoffrey, who was Secretary of State for Ireland from 1581 to 1603. Lawrence was appointed clerk to the Council of Munster in 1605, and escheator and receiver of the province of Munster, jointly with his brother William. They were also made jointly Surveyor General of the Irish Crown lands. Both became wealthy through their acquisition of Government offices and through the practice of "land-grabbing", which was common among English officials in Ireland at this time.

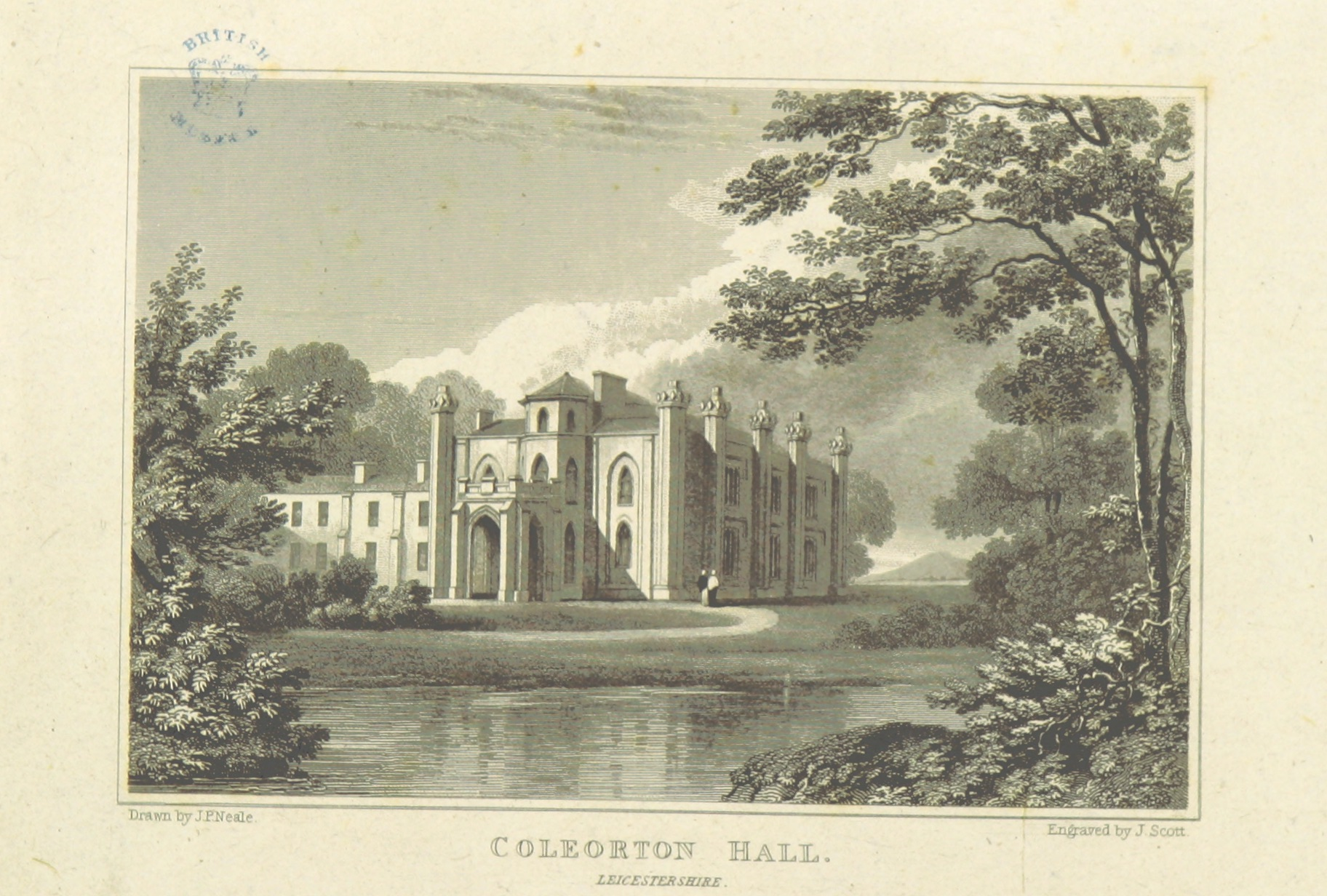
Coleorton Hall, Leicestershire, the home of Lawrence's grandmother Cicely Beaumont

Lawrence resolved on a legal career and entered Gray's Inn in 1606. He was called to the Bar in 1612, entered the King's Inns the same year and became its Treasurer in 1623. In 1624 he was assigned his own chamber in the Inns. He was appointed Attorney General for Munster in 1612, and sat in the Irish House of Commons in the Parliament of 1613–15 as MP for Tallow, along with Sir Gerard Lowther the elder, uncle and namesake of his future son-in-law. He acted as legal adviser to his cousin by marriage, the Earl of Cork. He became Recorder of Youghal in 1615.

== Admiralty judge ==
While he owed much to the goodwill of his uncle Sir Geoffrey Fenton (who died in 1608) and to Lord Cork, who was rapidly becoming the dominant political figure in Munster, and with whom he exchanged lavish gifts, his most powerful patron was the prime royal favourite George Villiers, 1st Duke of Buckingham. It was Buckingham who had Adam Loftus, 1st Viscount Loftus, for many years Lord Chancellor of Ireland, dismissed as judge of the Irish Court of Admiralty (which had been joined with the office of Lord Chancellor) in 1619 and replaced by Parsons.

Parsons was generally agreed to be a failure as Admiralty judge: allowing that the Court in his time was not very busy, he seems to have been lazy and inattentive to such business as there was. Henry Cary, 1st Viscount Falkland, the Lord Lieutenant of Ireland, complained that Parsons did no work, and employed a deputy to carry out his functions. He was accused of corruption in 1626, in that he had appropriated Admiralty funds, but the Lord President of Munster, Sir Edward Villiers, who was the half-brother of Parsons's great patron, Buckingham, took an indulgent view of the matter, saying that Parsons might "help himself to trifles and petty commodities" but that if he had taken any substantial sum "he has been so cautious that I cannot detect him". Further accusations of corruption were made against Parsons the following year, when he and Lord Falkland were accused of taking substantial bribes to release a Spanish ship, the Vinecorne, which had been brought in as a prize to port in Kinsale laden with wine: it was alleged that they had fraudulently determined that the ship was not a prize at all, as it was not Spanish. In 1627 he was suspended for a time pending an investigation into his alleged misconduct; the matter was not resolved before his death the following year.

== Baron of the Exchequer ==
In 1624 he was appointed second Baron of the Court of Exchequer (Ireland). He further damaged his reputation for integrity by going on the notorious Leinster assize of 1625, when he and the senior judge Dominick Sarsfield, 1st Viscount Sarsfield, Chief Justice of the Irish Common Pleas, were later accused of procuring the conviction and execution of an innocent man, Philip Bushen, for murder. There was much adverse comment about the judges' conduct at the trial, but the full investigation into the Bushen case, an inquiry which ultimately destroyed Sarsfield's career, did not take place until 1633, by which time Parsons was dead. Despite the charges of corruption against him, he continued to go regularly as a judge of assize.

In his last years, he was engaged in a battle to retain control of the Court of Admiralty, in face of the rival claim of Loftus, who took advantage of Parsons's suspension in 1627 to try to regain his seat there. The matter was still in the balance when Parsons died in 1628. Loftus, who resumed the office, uncharitably said that he would now be obliged to introduce some order into the Court to remedy the "chaos" created by Parsons. In fact, Loftus rarely if ever sat in the Admiralty Court after 1628, delegating his duties to the well-regarded English civilian lawyer Alan Cooke, who was the acting Admiralty judge for Leinster until 1647.

== Birr ==
Lawrence was far more usefully occupied as the "planter" of Birr, County Offaly, which was known as Parsonstown between 1620 and 1899. In 1620, at Buckingham's instigation, he was granted 1277 acres of land in Offaly and County Longford, together with Birr Castle and the manor of Parsonstown, and the right to hold a manorial court. He rebuilt Birr Castle in its present form. He was an improving landlord, building the parish church, and laying out the main street of Birr. He petitioned for the setting up of a free school, obtained a charter to hold markets and fairs in Birr, and encouraged the setting up of a flourishing glass factory at Shinrone, County Offaly, which was managed by the French Huguenot Bigo family (some traces of their factory were discovered in the late 1990s).

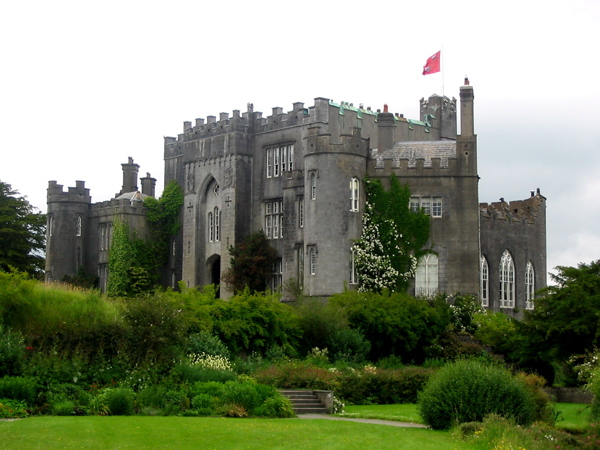
Birr Castle, which Parsons rebuilt, and where his descendants still live

== Residence ==
While he is mainly associated with Birr Castle, he lived for many years in Myrtle Grove, Youghal, the former home of Sir Walter Raleigh, which he leased from the Earl of Cork, and also owned a house in Rathfarnham, Dublin, where he died in September 1628. His widow after his death resided mainly at Ballydonagh Castle, near Cloughjordan, County Tipperary, which was her own property to bequeath.

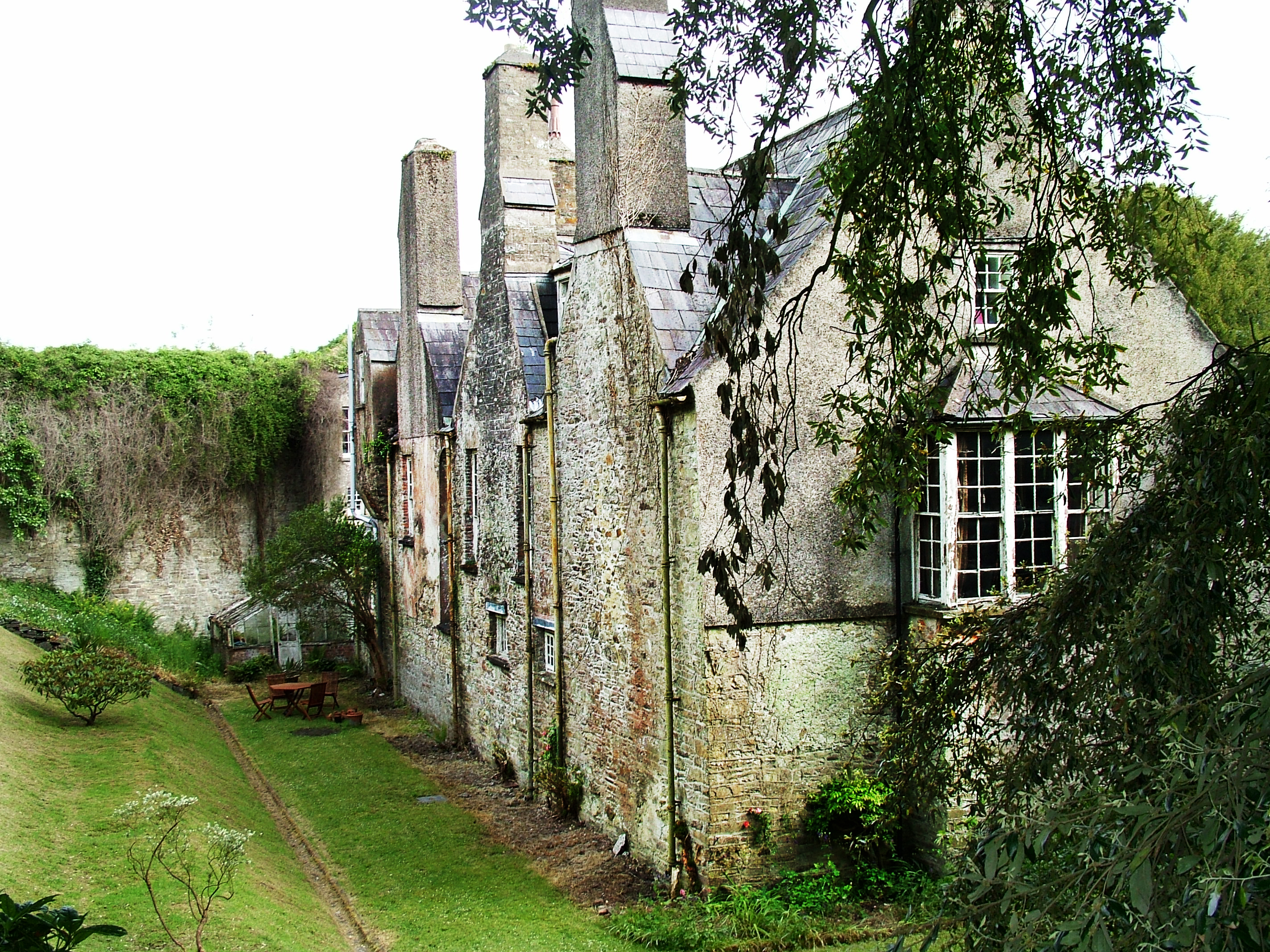
Myrtle Grove, Youghal, former home of Sir Walter Raleigh, later leased by Lord Cork to Parsons

== Family ==
By his wife, Anne Malham of Yorkshire, a relative of the prominent Tempest family, he had three sons:

- William, from whom the present Earl of Rosse is descended
- Richard (died before 1644)
- Fenton

-and at least two daughters:

- Catherine, who married Sir William Cole, MP for County Fermanagh and Provost (civil) of Enniskillen, and was the mother of Michael Cole, ancestor of the Earl of Enniskillen, and Sir John Cole, 1st Baronet.
- Anne (died 1634), who married Sir Gerard Lowther who, like her father, was a former Attorney General for Munster. Lowther was also a future Chief Justice of the Irish Common Pleas.

Lady Parsons died in October 1646; her will, made in 1644, survives. It shows that she possessed substantial personal property (including several silver basins) and also lands, including her "Castle of Ballydonagh" which she left to William. She also seems to have been a shrewd woman of business: her will refers to several loans which she had bought up.

== Sources ==
- Ball, F. Elrington The Judges in Ireland 1221–1921 London John Murray 1926
- Barry, Judy "Lawrence Parsons" Cambridge Dictionary of Irish Biography 2009
- Betham, Sir William Index to the Prerogative Wills of Ireland 1536–1810 Published by E. Ponsonby Dublin 1897
- Costello, Kevin The Court of Admiralty of Ireland 1575–1893 Four Courts Dublin 2011
- Kenny, Colum King's Inns and the Kingdom of Ireland Irish Academic Press 1992
