= Sir William Parsons, 1st Baronet of Bellamont =

Lord justice of Ireland (died 1650)

William Parsons
- Baronet of Bellamont
- Tenure: 1620–1650
- Successor: Sir William Parsons, 2nd Baronet
- Born: c. 1570
- Died: 1650
- Spouse: Elizabeth Lany
- Issue Detail: Richard & others
- Father: James Parsons
- Mother: Catherine Fenton

Sir William Parsons, 1st Baronet of Bellamont, PC (Ire) (c. 1570 – 1650), was known as a "land-hunter" expropriating land from owners whose titles were deemed defective. He also served as Surveyor General of Ireland and was an undertaker in several plantations. He governed Ireland as joint Lord Justice of Ireland from February 1640 to April 1643 during the Irish rebellion of 1641 and the beginning of the Irish Confederate War.

== Birth and origins ==
Family tree

William Parsons with wife, parents, and other selected relatives. (Note: This family tree is based on the genealogy of the Earls of Rosse. Also see the lists of siblings and children in the text.)

Henry; Fenton
James; Parsons; 1545–1570 d.v.p.*	Catherine; Fenton; 1548–1570	Geoffrey; Fenton c. 1539 – 1608	Alice; Brady
William; Parsons; 1st Bt. Bellamont c. 1570 – 1650	Elizabeth; Lany d. 1640	Lawrence; Parsons d. 1628 judge	Richard; Boyle; 1st Earl of Cork c. 1566 – 1643	Catherine; Fenton c. 1588 – 1630
Richard; Parsons d.v.p.*	Lettice; Loftus d. 1633	William; Parsons d. 1652
William; 2nd Bt. d. 1658	Catherine; Jones	Laurence; Parsons; 1st Bt. Birr c. 1632–1698

Legend

XXX	William; Parsons	XXX	Baronets of Bellamont & Viscounts Rosse	XXX	Baronets of Birr	XXX	Earls of Cork

*d.v.p. = predeceased his father (decessit vita patris)

William was born in England about 1570, the eldest son of James Parsons and Catherine Fenton. His father was the second son of Thomas Parsons of Diseworth, Leicestershire. William's mother was a daughter of Henry Fenton and Cicely Beaumont, and a sister of Sir Geoffrey Fenton, the Principal Secretary of State in Ireland to Elizabeth I. Both his parents' families were English and Protestant.

William listed among his brothers
He was the eldest of three brothers:
1. William (c. 1570 – 1650)
2. Lawrence (died 1628), became a judge and father of William Parsons, 1st Baronet of Birr Castle
3. Fenton, was knighted

== Early life ==
Parsons settled in Ireland about 1590, in the last years of the reign of Queen Elizabeth I. He became a commissioner of plantations and obtained considerable territorial grants from the Crown. In 1602, Parsons became Surveyor General of Ireland; In 1610 he obtained a pension of £30 (English) per annum for life. In 1611, he was joined with his younger brother Laurence in the supervisorship of the crown lands, with a fee of £60 per annum for life. His proposal that a Court of Wards be established in Ireland was accepted and he became its first master.

=== MP 1613–1615 ===
He sat in the Irish House of Commons of the Parliament of 1613–1615, the only Irish Parliament of James I, as one of the two members for Newcastle Borough, County Dublin. This was one of the 39 new boroughs the King created for this parliament in an effort to ensure a Protestant majority.

== Marriage and children ==
About 1615 (Note: The date of Parsons's marriage must have been before 1617 as his son Richard became an MP in 1629 and must therefore have been at least 21.) William Parsons married his cousin Elizabeth, eldest daughter of John Lany, an Alderman of Dublin, and niece of his maternal uncle Sir Geoffrey Fenton. This marriage made him a cousin of Richard Boyle, 1st Earl of Cork, the dominant Anglo-Irish magnate of his time, to whom he was close.

William and Elizabeth had five sons:

1. Richard (living 1639), MP for the borough of Wicklow, married Lettice Loftus, eldest daughter of Sir Adam Loftus of Rathfarnham, vice-treasurer of the Exchequer, and predeceased his father
2. John, married Elizabeth, daughter of Sir Walsingham Cooke, of Tomduffe, County Wexford
3. Francis (died 1668) of Garrydice, County Leitrim, married Sarah Faircloath, and left children
4. James, died unmarried and
5. William, died unmarried

—and seven daughters:

1. Catherine, married Sir James Barry, created 1st Baron Barry of Santry
2. Margaret, married Thomas Stockdale of Bilton Park, Yorkshire
3. Elizabeth, married Sir William Ussher, of Grange Castle, County Wicklow, grandson of Sir William Ussher, clerk of the Privy Council of Ireland
4. Jane, married Sir John Hoey, Knight of Dunganstown, County Wicklow
5. Mary, married Arthur Hill of Hillsborough, County Down
6. Anne, married Sir Paul Davys, Secretary of State (Ireland)
7. Judith, married Thomas Whyte of Redhills, County Cavan

== Later life ==
=== Knight and Baronet ===
Parsons personally presented surveys of escheated estates to King James I. On 7 June 1620 Parsons was knighted by Oliver St John,.

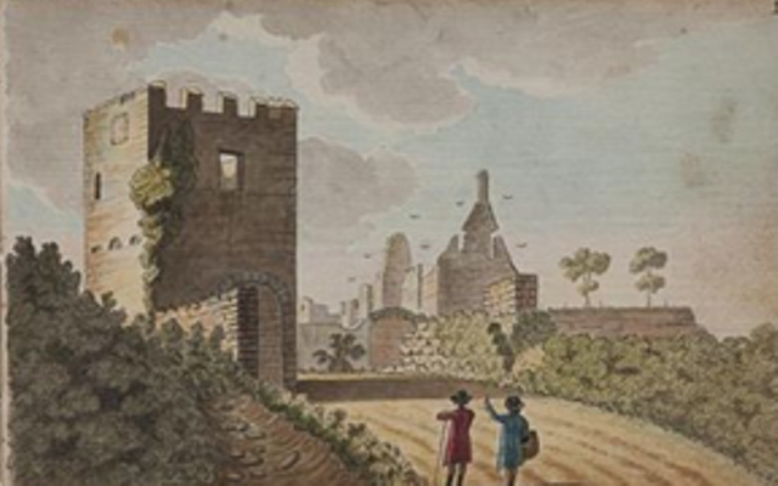
Ruin of Bellamont Castle in 1767

He was created 1st Baronet Parsons on 10 November. Parsons built or perhaps rebuilt Bellamount Castle in 1622. The ruin of a tower remains and stands in Ballymount Park, SW-Dublin, alongside the M50 Motorway. This baronetcy must not be confused with the later baronetcy Parsons of Birr Castle created in 1677.

In 1623 Parsons was sworn a member of the Privy Council of Ireland. On 12 January 1632 Thomas Wentworth, 1st Viscount Wentworth (later Earl of Strafford) was appointed Lord Deputy of Ireland. During the years 1633–40, when Strafford was all-powerful in Ireland, Parsons prudently offered him no open opposition, but he came increasingly to dislike and distrust "that strange man ... a mischief to so many".

Parsons was notorious as a "land-hunter", who acquired lands previously held by Irish clans by dubious legal means. He has been particularly censured by historians for the seizure of the former O'Byrne lands in County Wicklow, although it has also been argued that his behaviour was no worse than that of his partner in the transaction, Lord Lieutenant Wentworth, who proceeded to swindle Parsons out of his share.

=== MP 1634–1635 and 1639–1649 ===
According to Bagwell (1909) and Clavin (2009), Parson was one of the two MPs for County Armagh during the Parliament of 1634–1635, the first of Charles I, but the list of Irish MPs compiled in 1878 states that Sir Faithful Fortescue, knight, and Sir George Radcliffe, knight, sat for County Armagh in that parliament.

Parsons sat in the Irish House of Commons of the Parliament of 1639–1649, the second parliament of Charles I, as one of the two members for County Wicklow, at which occasion his residence is given as "Bellamont, Dublin". His son Richard sat for Wicklow.

=== Lord Justice ===
In December 1640 Parsons was appointed Lord Justice jointly with Robert Dillon, the future 2nd Earl of Roscommon. (Note: Burke (1866) by error states that Parsons was appointed Lord Deputy.) However, Dillon was soon removed as he was considered to have been too close to Strafford. On 10 February 1641 Parsons was resworn with Sir John Borlase, Master-General of the Ordnance.

The King appointed Robert Sidney, 2nd Earl of Leicester Lord Lieutenant of Ireland in 1641 but Leicester never went to Ireland and left the administration of the country to the Lords Justices. Leicester would resign in 1643 to make place for Ormond.

Strafford was executed on 12 May 1641. His downfall ruined those members of the Irish administration who had been close to him, but Parsons, who had quarrelled with Strafford over the O'Byrne land deal, was clearly identified as one of his enemies, and Strafford's fall strengthened Parsons's position in the short term.

When the Irish Rebellion of 1641 broke out, Sir William had to cope with it virtually single-handedly, since his colleague Borlase was incompetent. His management of the crisis has been much criticised, in particular, his habit of dealing with the English Parliament directly without informing King Charles I. His enemies accused him of inflaming, or even provoking the Rebellion, as a pretext for a second and more thorough conquest of Ireland. Certainly he argued that the Rebellion must be crushed ruthlessly, and rejected all attempts at compromise.

Parsons continued in the government until April 1642, when Charles I replaced him with Sir Henry Tichborne. In 1643 Parsons was charged with treason, and committed to prison, together with Adam Loftus, 1st Viscount Loftus and others. He was quickly released, but complained bitterly of this "poor reward" for his "zealous and painful toil on behalf of the Crown". He continued to live in Dublin until 1648 when he retired to England.

== Death, succession, and timeline ==
Parsons died in January or February 1650 at Westminster, London, and was buried in St Margaret's, Westminster. As his eldest son Richard had predeceased him, he was succeeded by his grandson William as the 2nd Baronet Parsons. The 2nd Baronet married Catherine, the eldest daughter of Arthur Jones, 2nd Viscount Ranelagh and his wife Katherine Jones, Viscountess Ranelagh, née Boyle.

Timeline
As his birth date is uncertain, so are all his ages.
Age	Date	Event
0	1570, about	Born
19–20	1590, about	Settled in Ireland
31–32	1602, 26 Dec	Succeeded his uncle Geoffrey Fenton as Surveyor General of Ireland
32–33	1603, 24 Mar	Accession of King James I, succeeding Queen Elizabeth I
42–43	1613, 22 Apr	Returned MP for Newcastle Borough.
44–45	1615, estimate	Married Elizabeth, eldest daughter of John Lany, an alderman of Dublin
49–50	1620, 10 Nov	Created 1st Baronet of Bellamont
54–55	1625, 27 Mar	Accession of King Charles I, succeeding King James I
61–62	1632, 12 Jan	Thomas Wentworth appointed Lord Deputy for Ireland
68–69	1639, 10 Mar	Returned MP for County Wicklow
69–70	1640, 5 Apr	Wife died.
70	1640, 31 Dec	Sworn in as joint Lord Justice with Robert Dillon
70–71	1641, 12 May	Strafford beheaded
70–71	1641, 23 Oct	Outbreak of the Rebellion
71–72	1642, 31 Mar	Replaced with Sir Henry Tichborne as Lord Justice.
79–80	1650, early in	Died in London

== See also ==
- List of Irish Parliaments

== Notes and references ==
=== Sources ===
- Armstrong, R. M. (2004). "Tichborne, Sir Henry (1581?–1667)". In Matthew, Colin; Harrison, Brian (eds.). Oxford Dictionary of National Biography. Vol. 54. New York: Oxford University Press. pp. 754–756. ISBN 0-19-861404-7.
- Asch, Ronald G. (2004). "Wentworth, Thomas, first earl of Strafford (1593–1641)". In Matthew, Colin; Harrison, Brian (eds.). Oxford Dictionary of National Biography. Vol. 56. New York: Oxford University Press. pp. 142–157. ISBN 0-19-861408-X.
- Bagwell, Richard (1909). Ireland under the Stuarts and under the Interregnum. Vol. I. London: Longmans, Green, and Co. OCLC 458582656. – 1603 to 1642
- Burke, Bernard (1866). A Genealogical History of the Dormant, Abeyant, Forfeited and Extinct Peerages of the British Empire (New ed.). London: Harrison. OCLC 11501348.
- Burke, Bernard; Burke, Ashworth Peter (1915). A Genealogical and Heraldic History of the Peerage and Baronetage, the Privy Council, Knightage and Companionage (77th ed.). London: Harrison. OCLC 1155471554.
- Clavin, Terry (October 2009). McGuire, James; Quinn, James (eds.). "Parsons, Sir William". Dictionary of Irish Biography.
- Cokayne, George Edward (1893). Complete peerage of England, Scotland, Ireland, Great Britain and the United Kingdom, extant, extinct, or dormant. Vol. V (1st ed.). London: George Bell and Sons. OCLC 1180836840. – L to M (for Earl of Leicester)
- Cokayne, George Edward (1895). Complete Peerage of England, Scotland, Ireland, Great Britain and the United Kingdom, Extant, Extinct, or Dormant. Vol. VI (1st ed.). London: George Bell and Sons. OCLC 1180818801. – N to R
- Cokayne, George Edward (1900). Complete Baronetage, 1611 to 1800. Vol. I (1st ed.). Exeter: William Pollard & Co. OCLC 866278985. – 1611 to 1625
- Cokayne, George Edward (1904). Complete Baronetage, 1611 to 1800. Vol. IV (1st ed.). Exeter: William Pollard & Co. OCLC 866278985. – 1665 to 1707
- Chisholm, Hugh, ed. (1911). "Rosse, Earl of" . Encyclopædia Britannica. Vol. 23 (11th ed.). Cambridge University Press. pp. 744–745.
- Dunlop, Robert (1895). "Parsons, Sir William (1570? – 1650)". In Lee, Sidney (ed.). Dictionary of National Biography. Vol. XLIII. London: Smith, Elder, & Co. pp. 419–421. OCLC 8544105.
- Fryde, Edmund Boleslaw; Greenway, D. E.; Porter, S.; Roy, I., eds. (1986). Handbook of British Chronology. Royal Historical Society Guides and Handbooks, No. 2 (3rd ed.). London: Offices of the Royal Historical Society. ISBN 0-86193-106-8. – (for timeline)
- House of Commons (1878). Return. Members of Parliament – Part II. Parliaments of Great Britain, 1705–1796. Parliaments of the United Kingdom, 1801–1874. Parliaments and Conventions of the Estates of Scotland, 1357–1707. Parliaments of Ireland, 1599–1800. London: His/Her Majesty's Stationery Office. OCLC 13112546. – (for the subject and his son Richard as MPs)
- Lodge, John (1789). Archdall, Mervyn (ed.). The Peerage of Ireland or, A Genealogical History of the Present Nobility of that Kingdom. Vol. IV. Dublin: James Moore. OCLC 264906028. – Viscounts (for Ranelagh)
- Shaw, William A. (1906). The Knights of England. Vol. II. London: Sherratt & Hughes. – Knights bachelors & Index
- Warner, Ferdinand (1768). History of the Rebellion and Civil-War in Ireland. Vol. I. Dublin: James William. OCLC 82770539. – 1641 to 1643

Parliament of Ireland
New constituency	Member of Parliament for Newcastle Borough; 1613–1615; With: William Rolles	Succeeded by Sir John Dongan, Bt. Patrick Sherlock
Baronetage of Ireland
New title	Baronet (of Bellamont); 1620–1650	Succeeded by William Parsons
Parliament of Ireland
Preceded by Sir Robert Talbot, 2nd Baronet; Bryan Byrne	Member of Parliament for County Wicklow; 1639–1649; With: Sir William Ussher	Succeeded by Folliott Wingfield; Abraham Yarner
Political offices
Vacant Title last held by Richard Boyle, 1st Earl of Cork	Lord Justice of Ireland; 1640–1642; With: Robert Dillon, 1st Baron Kilkenny-West to 1641; Sir John Borlase from 1641	Succeeded by Sir Henry Tichborne; Sir John Borlase
