= Richard Parsons, 1st Earl of Rosse =

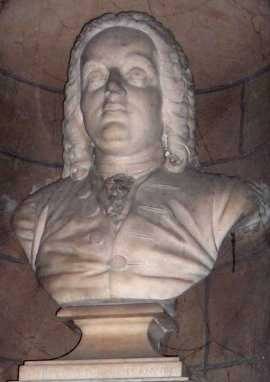

Richard Parsons, 1st Earl of Rosse (1702 – 21 June 1741), Freemason and a founder-member of the Hell-Fire Club, 2nd Viscount Rosse of Bellamont co. Dublin, Baron Oxmantown, 3rd baronet.

== Early life ==
An Irish peer, he was born at Twickenham, Middlesex, the son of Richard Parsons, 1st Viscount Rosse (c. 1657-1703) and Elizabeth Hamilton, niece of Sarah Jennings, Duchess of Marlborough. His family had settled at New Ross, County Wexford at the beginning of the 17th century. The spelling Rosse distinguishes this Irish family from a Scottish title, Ross.

== Career ==
Upon the death of his father in 1703, he succeeded as the second Viscount Rosse. On 16 June 1718, he was created the Earl of Rosse.

=== Freemason and Grandmaster of the Grand Lodge of Ireland ===
In 1725, he was elected the Grandmaster of the Grand Lodge of Ireland, a post he held for the next six years.

All official records of the Grand Lodge of Ireland prior to 1760, and all minute books prior to 1780, have been lost. While Rosse is the first recorded Grand Master of Ireland, the belief that he was Grand Master in 1723 and again in 1730 is from newspaper accounts of the day.

=== The Hell-Fire Club ===
A founder member of the Hell-Fire Club, Parsons was a notable Libertine (and nihilist), rebelling against the norms of the day. He wrote the book Dionysus Rising after a trip to Egypt where he claimed to have found Dionysian scrolls looted from the Great Library of Alexandria. After writing his book he founded the Sacred Sect of Dionysus. An offshoot of freemasonry called the Revived Order of Dionysus is in existence in New Orleans, USA, and split due to a belief that Freemasonry is descendant from a pre-Christian cult called Dionysiac Architects. They were inspired by Richard Parsons's book, only two copies of which exist to this day.

== Personal life ==
The late Earl of Rosse was, in character and disposition, like the humorous Earl of Rochester; he had an infinite fund of wit, great spirits, and a liberal heart; was fond of all the vices which the beau monde call pleasures, and by those means first impaired his fortune as much as he possibly could do; and finally, his health, beyond repair.

On 25 June 1714, he married Mary Paulet, the eldest daughter of Lord William Powlett and a granddaughter of the 1st Duke of Bolton and the marquis de Montpouillon. They were the parents of two sons and a daughter:

- Richard Parsons, 2nd Earl of Rosse (1716–1764), who died without issue.

After his first wife's death on 15 August 1718, he married Frances Claxton. Among her siblings were sisters Lucy, the wife of James Johnston Secretary of State, Scotland, and Mary, wife of Thomas Carter.

Lord Rosse died on 21 June 1741 at his home in Molesworth Street Dublin in the parish of St Anne. On his deathbed he received a letter from the vicar of St Anne, the dean of Kilmore "to remind him of his past life, the particulars of which he mentioned, such as profligacy, gaming, drinking, rioting, turning day into night, blaspheming his Maker, and, in short, all manner of wickedness; and exhorting him in the tenderest manner to employ the few moments that remained to him, in penitently confessing his manifold transgressions, and soliciting his pardon from an offended Deity, before whom he was shortly to appear."

Parsons ordered the letter, addressed only to My Lord, to be put into a fresh cover and carried by the dean's own servant to an unusually pious gentleman, the Earl of Kildare. On reading it the very angry Kildare sent the letter to John Hoadly, Archbishop of Dublin, Primate of Ireland, who immediately summoned the dean for his explanation. By the time it was understood what had been done, Parsons was dead. He was succeeded in his titles by his eldest son, Richard. His widow Frances married Viscount Jocelyn, Lord Chancellor of Ireland before her death in 1772.

=== Legacy ===
As his sons died without issue, the earldom became extinct in 1764. However, there was a second creation of the title Parsons, Earl of Rosse in 1806 for the descendants of a junior branch which had settled at Birr, King’s County in the early 17th century instead of New Ross. Today's Parsons of Birr Castle are not his direct descendants of the original earl.

Masonic offices
| Preceded by none | Grandmaster of the Grand Lodge of Ireland; 1725–1731 | Succeeded by The Lord Kingston |
Peerage of Ireland
| New creation | Earl of Rosse; 1718–1741 | Succeeded by Richard Parsons |
| Preceded by Richard Parsons | Viscount Rosse; 1703–1741 | Succeeded by Richard Parsons |
