= Womersley Park =

House in Womersley, North Yorkshire, England

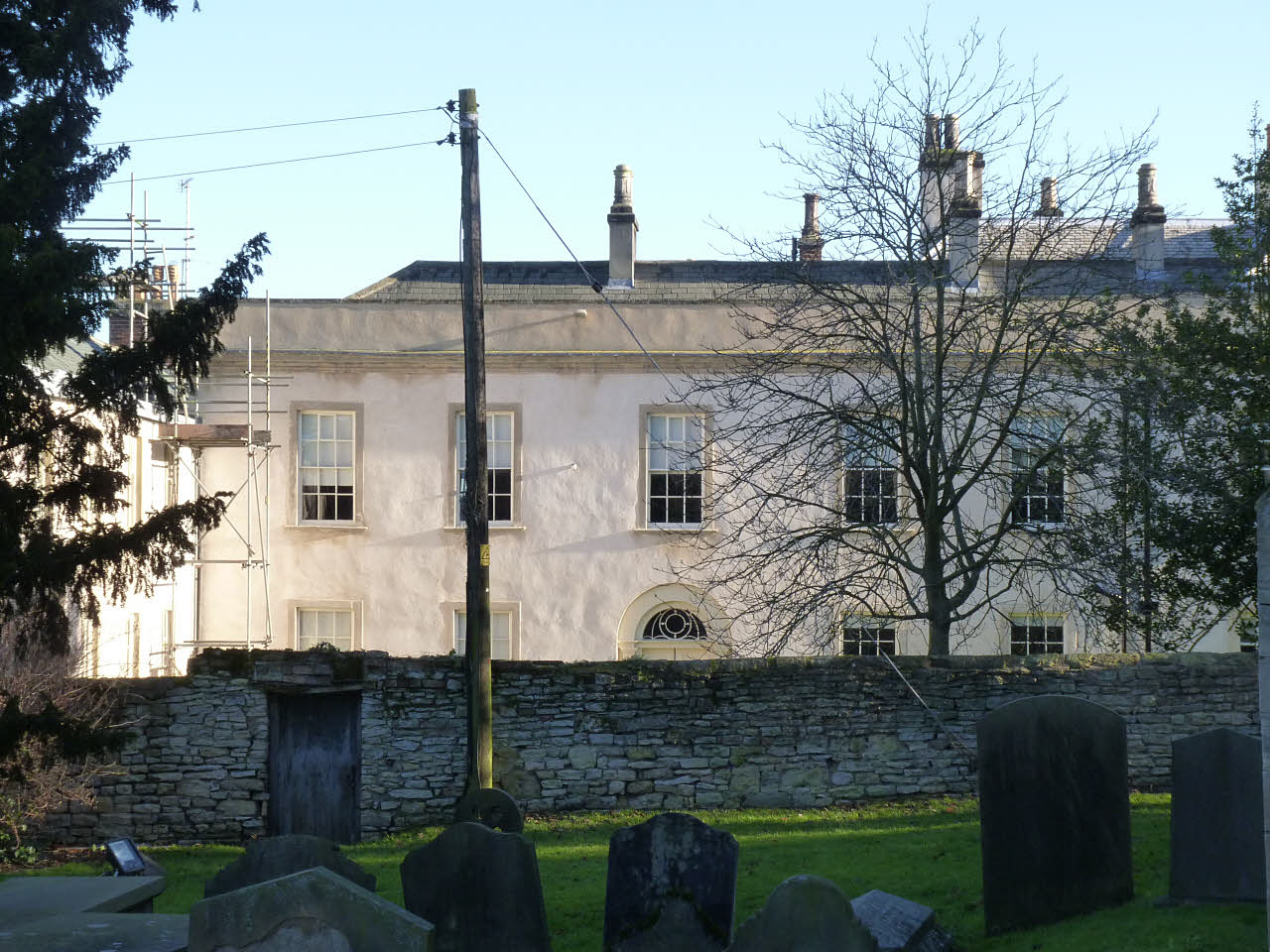
- Part of the house in 2013

- Location within North Yorkshire

General information
- Location: Park Lane, Womersley, North Yorkshire, England
- Coordinates: 53°39′53″N 1°11′42″W
- Year built: 17th century
- Renovated: Late 17th and early 18th century (added and altered); Mid and late 18th century (altered); 19th century (altered)

Renovating team
- Architects: James Paine (mid-18th century); Robert Adam (late 18th century)

Listed Building – Grade II*
- Official name: Womersley Park and adjoining coach-house and stables
- Designated: 1 December 1967
- Reference no.: 1316344

Womersley Park is a historic building on Park Lane in Womersley, a village in North Yorkshire, England.

== History ==
The house was built in the 17th century, and was extensively altered around 1680 for Tobiah Harvey. A southern wing was added in the mid 18th century, probably by James Paine, and at the same time the village's main street was diverted, to enhance the estate's privacy. The building was further altered in the late 18th century, probably by Robert Adam, and in the 19th century.

=== Owners ===
The house and estate came into the possession of the Earls of Rosse in 1870 when Lawrence Parsons, 4th Earl of Rosse married The Hon. Frances Cassandra Harvey-Hawke, who had inherited the estate from her father the 4th Baron Hawke in 1869.

Much of the parkland was sold off in 1930; at the time of the sale the estate comprised approximately 4,700 acres (1,900 ha). The house and remaining grounds remained in the ownership of the Parsons family until 2004.

The stepson of Michael Parsons, 6th Earl of Rosse, Antony Armstrong-Jones lived there during the Second World War, and may have set up his first photography studio in the building. The house was Grade II* listed, along with the adjoining coach house and stables, in 1967.

Womersley was purchased in 2004 by Stuart and Ruth Evison, who restored the building, and put it up for sale in 2025 for £5 million.

=== Design and architecture ===
The house is built of magnesian limestone, mainly rendered, with dressings in brick and stone, and hipped Welsh slate roofs. It has a U-shaped plan, with a main range of two storeys and attics, seven bays, and flanking projecting two-storey wings ending in canted bay windows. In the centre is a Doric portico with engaged pilasters, a frieze and a pediment. The windows are sashes in architraves with moulded sills. Above are a moulded cornice, a parapet and roof dormers. On the west front is a round-arched doorway with Doric pilasters and a divided fanlight. The coach house and stable range form an inverted U-shaped plan to the northwest. The main range has two storeys and six bays, and contains a carriage entrance with a segmental arch and a quoined surround.

Inside, the entrance hall has a Doric arcade, an elaborate cornice, a marble fireplace flanked by nymphs, and alcoves with glazed doors. It leads to the staircase hall with a mahogany open well staircase, iron lamps on the corners, a bicolour marble fireplace, and a window with 17th-century stained glass by Henry Gyles. The drawing room in the east wing, probably designed by Paine, has a ceiling with mouldings of armour and natural life, a Corinthian arcade, and a grand three-colour marble fireplace with a relief of a youth with grapes and a dog. The service staircase is early 18th century, the library with built-in bookcases is probably by Adam, and other rooms have elaborate fireplaces, plasterwork and woodwork.

== See also ==
- Grade II* listed buildings in North Yorkshire (district)
- Listed buildings in Womersley
