= Charles Moore, 1st Earl of Charleville =

Irish peer and freemason

Charles Moore, 1st Earl of Charleville PC (24 January 1712 – 17 February 1764), known as The Lord Moore between 1725 and 1758, was an Irish peer and freemason.

Moore was the son of John Moore, 1st Baron Moore, and Mary Lum, daughter of Elnathan Lum. He was educated at Trinity College, Dublin, and succeeded his father in the barony in 1725. He was sworn of the Irish Privy Council in 1746 and created Earl of Charleville, in the King's County, in the Irish peerage in 1758. From 1761 to 1764, he was Governor and Custos Rotulorum of King's County.

Lord Charleville married Hester Coghill, daughter of James Coghill, in 1737. The marriage was childless. He died in February 1764, aged 51, when the barony and earldom became extinct. He left his estates to his nephew John Bury, whose son Charles was created Earl of Charleville in 1806. Lady Charleville married Sir John Cogill, 1st Baronet. She died in July 1789.

Peerage of Ireland
New creation	Earl of Charleville; 1758–1764	Extinct
Preceded by John Moore	Baron Moore; 1725–1764	Extinct
