= Earl of Rosse =

Irish Earl

Earldom of Rosse
- Arms: Gules, three Leopards’ Faces Argent. Crest: A Cubit-Arm proper grasping a Poleaxe erect Gules. Supporters: On either side an Ounce Argent spotted sable gorged with a Collar Gules charged with four Bezants.
- Creation date: 3 February 1806
- Creation: Second
- Created by: George III
- Peerage: Peerage of Ireland
- First holder: Laurence Parsons, 1st Viscount Oxmantown
- Present holder: Brendan Parsons, 7th Earl of Rosse
- Heir apparent: Lawrence Parsons, Lord Oxmantown
- Subsidiary titles: Baron Oxmantown
- Status: Extant
- Seat: Birr Castle
- Former seat: Womersley Park
- Motto: PRO DEO ET PATRIA AD ASTRA ("For God and country to the stars")

Earldom of Rosse
- Image of arms unavailable Arms: Gules, three Leopards’ Faces Or. Crest: A Halbert’s Head Or, imbrued proper. Supporters: On either side an Ounce Argent, palette, gorged with a Collar Gules.
- Creation date: 16 June 1718
- Creation: First
- Created by: George I
- Peerage: Peerage of Ireland
- First holder: Laurence Parsons, 2nd Viscount Rosse
- Last holder: Richard Parsons, 2nd Earl of Rosse
- Subsidiary titles: Viscount Rosse; Baron Oxmantown
- Status: Extinct
- Extinction date: 17 August 1764
- Motto: PRO DEO ET REGE ("For God and the King")

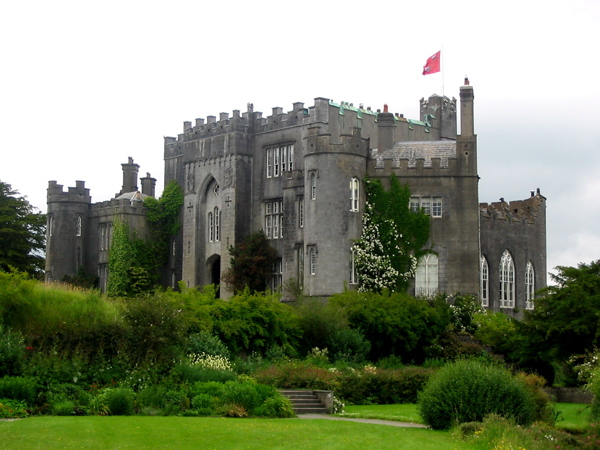
Birr Castle, County Offaly, seat of the Earls of Rosse

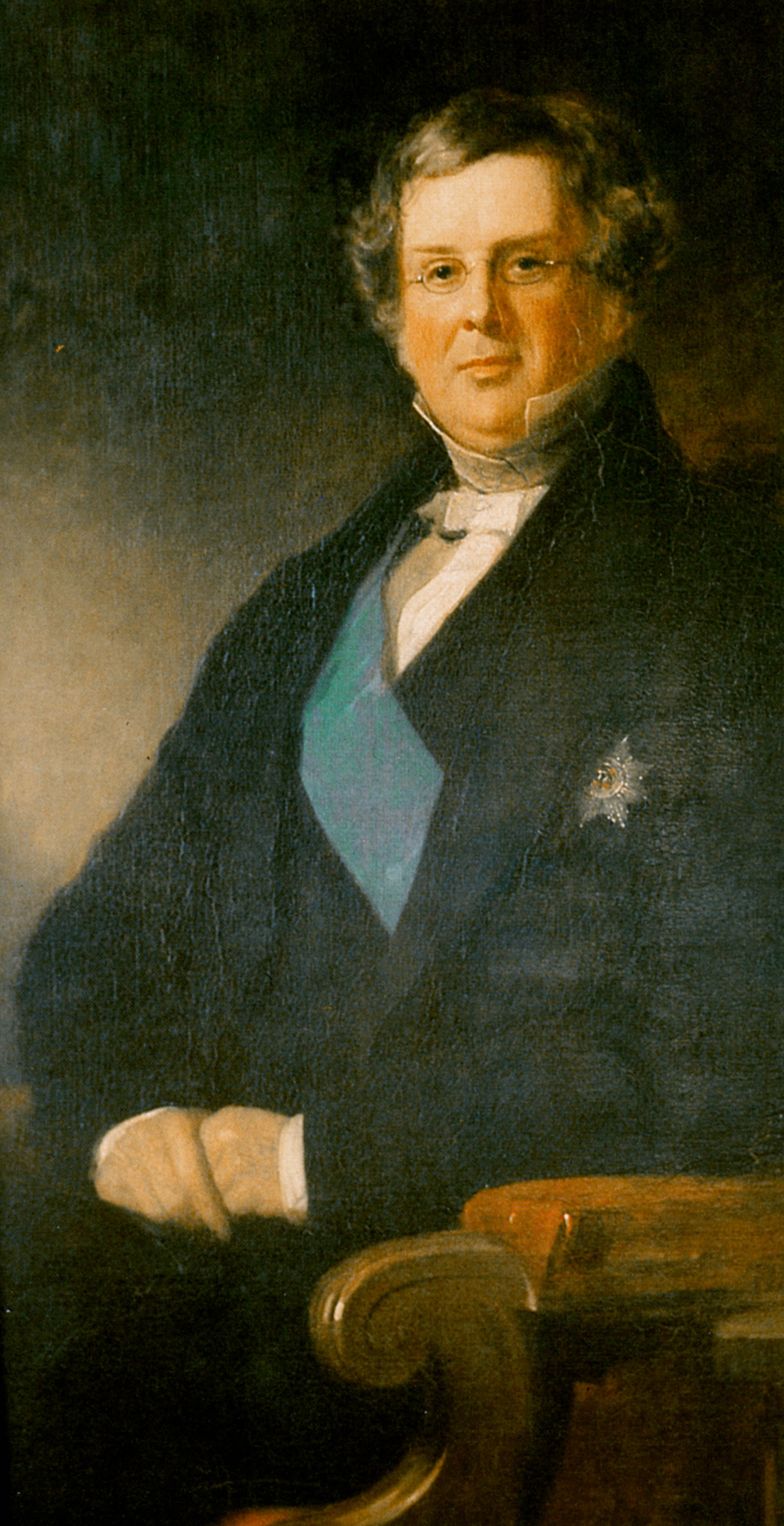
The 3rd Earl of Rosse

Earl of Rosse is a title that has been created twice in the Peerage of Ireland, both times for the Parsons family. "Rosse" refers to New Ross in County Wexford.

== History ==
The Parsons were originally an English family from Dishworth (Diseworth) Grange in Leicestershire; there having been five brothers who settled in Ireland during the late 16th century. One of the brothers, William Parsons, was created a Baronet in the Baronetage of Ireland of Bellamont in the County of Dublin in 1620 by James VI & I. The third Baronet was created Viscount Rosse in the Peerage of Ireland in 1681, and the second Viscount was created Earl of Rosse in the Peerage of Ireland in 1718; these titles of the first creation became extinct on the death of the second Earl in 1764.

Sir Lawrence Parsons, the younger brother of Sir William Parsons, 1st Baronet, settled in Birr, King's County, later known as Parsonstown, and was the ancestor of the younger (Birr) branch of the family. His grandson Laurence Parsons was created a Baronet, of Birr Castle in King's County, in the Baronetage of Ireland in 1677, but was attainted by King James II's Parliament in 1689 and sentenced to death. The sentence was never carried out, however. His great-grandson, the third Baronet, and great-great-grandson, the fourth Baronet, both represented King's County in the Irish House of Commons. The latter's half-brother Laurence Harman Parsons was in 1792 raised to the Peerage of Ireland as Baron Oxmantown, with remainder to his nephew Sir Lawrence Parsons, 5th Baronet, who had succeeded his father the fourth Baronet in 1791.

In 1795 he was made Viscount Oxmantown in the Peerage of Ireland, with normal remainder to the heirs male of his body, and in 1806 he was even further honoured when he was created Earl of Rosse in the Peerage of Ireland, with similar remainder as for the barony. Lord Rosse sat from 1800 to 1807 as one of the original Irish representative peer in the British House of Lords. On his death in 1807 the viscountcy became extinct while he was succeeded in the barony and earldom according to the special remainders by his aforementioned nephew, the 5th Baronet. The latter represented King's County in the British House of Commons and sat in the House of Lords as an Irish Representative Peer between 1809 and 1841.

The 2nd Earl's son, the 3rd Earl, was a well-known astronomer and famous for his construction of the giant telescope the Leviathan of Parsonstown at his seat Birr Castle. Lord Rosse also sat as Member of Parliament for King's County, was an Irish Representative Peer from 1845 to 1867 – years during which millions of the Irish population died from starvation or emigrated. He was one of the very few who foresaw the consequences of the potato blight and tried to alert the British authorities. He was Lord Lieutenant of King's County from 1831 to 1867 and President of the Royal Society from 1849 to 1854. He was succeeded by his son, the fourth Earl. He was an Irish Representative Peer between 1868 and 1908 and Lord Lieutenant of King's County between 1892 and 1908. His son, the fifth Earl, was an Irish Representative Peer from 1911 to 1918 and Lord-Lieutenant of King's County from 1908 to 1918. Lord Rosse fought in the First World War and died from wounds received in action in 1918. As of 2014 the titles are held by his grandson, the seventh Earl, who succeeded his father in 1979.

When the present Earl worked for the United Nations Development Programme, he did not use his title, preferring to be known by his family surname of Parsons.

== Estates and residences ==
The family seat is Birr Castle, near Birr, County Offaly. During the 1870s the Earls of Rosse owned more than 22,000 acres in King's County (later County Offaly) and 2,633 acres in County Tipperary. Birr Castle and its 120-acre demesne remain in the private ownership of the current Earl, Brendan Parsons, 7th Earl of Rosse, and his family.

In the 1883 edition of John Bateman's The Great Landowners of Great Britain and Ireland, Lawrence Parsons, 4th Earl of Rosse's estates were recorded as spanning 26,486 acres across Ireland and England, including 22,513 acres in King's County, 2,633 acres in County Tipperary, and 1,340 acres in the West Riding of Yorkshire, which produced a combined annual income of £15,549.

Bateman noted that the Yorkshire estate, which produced an annual income £5,089, stood in the name of the 4th Earl's mother, Mary, Dowager Countess of Rosse.

Through the marriage of the 4th Earl to the Yorkshire heiress The Hon. Frances Cassandra Harvey-Hawke in 1870, the family also came into possession of Womersley Park. Frances had inherited the estate from her father, Edward William Harvey-Hawke, on his death in 1869. The Earl and Countess frequently used Womersley as a residence alongside Birr Castle, and the estate remained associated with the Parsons family after the 4th Earl's death. Much of the Womersley estate was offered for sale in 1930, although the house and immediate parkland remained in the family until their sale in 2004.

== Parsons Baronets, of Bellamont (1620) ==
- Sir William Parsons, 1st Baronet of Bellamont (1570–1650)
- Sir William Parsons, 2nd Baronet of Bellamont (died 1658) grandson of the first baronet
- Richard Parsons, 3rd Baronet of Bellamont (c. 1657–1703) (created Viscount Rosse in 1681)

== Viscounts Rosse (1681) ==
- Richard Parsons, 1st Viscount Rosse (c. 1657–1703)
- Richard Parsons, 2nd Viscount Rosse (died 1741) (created Earl of Rosse in 1718)

== Earls of Rosse, First Creation (1718) ==
- Richard Parsons, 1st Earl of Rosse (died 1741)
- Richard Parsons, 2nd Earl of Rosse (c. 1716–1764)

== Parsons Baronets, of Birr Castle (1677) ==
- Sir Laurence Parsons, 1st Baronet (c. 1637–1698)
- Sir William Parsons, 2nd Baronet (died 1741)
- Sir Laurence Parsons, 3rd Baronet (1707–1756)
- Sir William Parsons, 4th Baronet (1731–1791)
- Sir Lawrence Parsons, 5th Baronet (1758–1841) (succeeded as Earl of Rosse in 1807)

== Earls of Rosse, Second Creation (1806) ==
- Laurence Harman Parsons, 1st Earl of Rosse (1749–1807)
- Lawrence Parsons, 2nd Earl of Rosse (1758–1841)
- William Parsons, 3rd Earl of Rosse (1800–1867)
- Lawrence Parsons, 4th Earl of Rosse (1840–1908)
- William Edward Parsons, 5th Earl of Rosse (1873–1918)
- Lawrence Michael Harvey Parsons, 6th Earl of Rosse (1906–1979)
- William Clere Leonard Brendan Parsons, 7th Earl of Rosse (born 1936)

The heir apparent is the present holder's son, Lawrence Patrick Parsons, Lord Oxmantown (born 1969). The heir apparent's heir apparent is his son, the Hon. William Charles Yufan Parsons (born 2008).

== Line of Succession ==
Earls of Rosse Line of Succession
- James Parsons
  - Sir William Parsons of Bellamont, 1st Baronet (d. c. 1649/50)
    - Richard Parsons (d. a. 1642)
      - Sir William Parsons, 2nd Baronet (d. 1658)
        - Richard Parsons, 1st Viscount Rosse (c. 1656—1702/3) (remainder to great-grandfather)
          - Richard Parsons, 1st Earl of Rosse (d. 1741)
            - Richard Parsons, 2nd Earl of Rosse (b. 1718–1764)
  - Sir Laurence Parsons (d. 1628)
    - William Parsons (d. 1653)
      - Sir Laurence Parsons, of Birr Castle, 1st Baronet (c. 1637–1698)
        - Sir William Parsons, 2nd Baronet (d. 1740/1)
          - William Parsons (d. bef. 1740)
            - Sir Laurence Parsons, 3rd Baronet (1707–1756)
              - Sir William Parsons, 4th Baronet (1731–1791)
                - Laurence Parsons, 2nd Earl of Rosse (1758–1841) Rep. peer from 1809, taking the Earl of Normanton's room; the Earl of Caledon followed.
                  - William Parsons, 3rd Earl of Rosse (1800–1867) Rep. peer from 1845, taking the Earl of Limerick's room; Lord Dunboyne followed.
                    - Lawrence Parsons, 4th Earl of Rosse (1840–1908) Rep. peer from 1868, taking Lord Farnham's room; Lord Ashtown followed.
                      - William Edward Parsons, 5th Earl of Rosse (1873–1918) Rep. peer from 1911, taking the 3rd Lord Bellew's room; Lord Charlemont followed.
                        - Laurence Michael Harvey Parsons, 6th Earl of Rosse (1906–1979)
                          - William Clere Leonard Brendan Parsons, 7th Earl of Rosse (b. 1936)
                            - (1) Lawrence Patrick Parsons, Lord Oxmantown (b. 1969)
                              - (2) Hon. William Charles Parsons (b. 2008)
                            - (3) Hon. Michael John Finn Parsons (b. 1981)
                          - Hon. Desmond Oliver Martin Parsons (1938–2010)
                            - (4) Rupert Alexander Michael Parsons (b. 1966)
                              - (5) Harry Oliver Parsons (b. 2000)
                            - (6) Desmond Edward Richard Parsons (b. 1968)
                    - Hon. Richard Clere Parsons (1851–1923)
                      - Arthur David Clere Parsons (1881–1955)
                        - Arthur Christopher Parsons (1919–1999)
                          - (7) Sir John Christopher Parsons (b. 1946)
                            - (8) Michael Reginald Parsons (b. 1983)
                            - (9) David Guy Parsons (b. 1985)
                              - (10) Reginald John Vernon Parsons (b. 2014)
                      - Rev. Canon Richard Edward Parsons (1888–1971)
                        - Reverend Desmond John Parsons (1925–2014)
                          - (11) Benedict Desmond Drummond Parsons (b. 1969)
                  - Hon. Laurence Parsons (1805–1894)
                    - Reverend Randolph Cecil Parsons (1852–1941)
                      - John Cecil Lawrence Parsons (1905–1978)
                        - (12) Michael Charles Parsons (b. 1950)
              - Laurence Harman Parsons, 1st Earl of Rosse (1749–1807) Rep. peer from 1801, the Earl of Kingston followed.

== See also ==
- Sir Charles Algernon Parsons
