= Sir William Parsons, 4th Baronet =

Irish politician and landowner (1731–1791)

Sir William Parsons, 4th Baronet of Birr Castle (6 May 1731 – 1 May 1791) was an Irish politician and baronet.

He was the son of Sir Laurence Parsons, 3rd Baronet and Mary Sprigge. From 1757 until his death in 1797, Parsons served as member of parliament (MP) in the Irish House of Commons for King's County. He was High Sheriff of King's County in 1779.

== Marriage and children ==
He married Mary Clere, daughter of John Clere, on 28 June 1754.

- Laurence Parsons, 2nd Earl of Rosse (21 May 1758 – 24 February 1841)
- John Clere Parsons (1760–1826)
- Reverend William Parsons (1764–1838)
- Thomas Clere Parsons (1766–1825)

Parliament of Ireland
Preceded by Henry Lyons; Sir Laurence Parsons, 3rd Bt	Member of Parliament for King's County; 1757–1791; With: Henry Lyons 1757–1768; John Lloyd 1768–1790; Denis Bowes Daly 1790–1791	Succeeded by Denis Bowes Daly; Sir Lawrence Parsons, 5th Bt
Baronetage of Ireland
Preceded by Laurence Parsons	Baronet (of Birr Castle); 1756–1791	Succeeded by Laurence Parsons
