= Sir William Parsons, 2nd Baronet =

Anglo-Irish politician

Sir William Parsons, 2nd Baronet (8 June 1661 – 17 March 1741) was an Anglo-Irish politician.

Parsons was the son of Sir Laurence Parsons, 1st Baronet and Frances Savage, and succeeded to his father's baronetcy in 1698. He was the Member of Parliament for King's County in the Irish House of Commons between 1692 and 1713, and then again from 1715 until his death in 1741. He was succeeded in his title by his grandson, Laurence Parsons.

Parliament of Ireland
Preceded by Heward Oxburgh; Owen Carrol	Member of Parliament for King's County; 1692-1713; With: Sir Francis Blundell, Bt (1692-1707); William Purefoy (1707-1713)	Succeeded by James Forth; John Moore
Preceded by James Forth; John Moore	Member of Parliament for King's County; 1715-1741; With: William Purefoy (1715-1727); Colley Lyons (1727-1741)	Succeeded by Trevor Lloyd; Sir Laurence Parsons, Bt
Baronetage of Ireland
Preceded by Laurence Parsons	Baronet (of Birr Castle); 1698-1741	Succeeded by Laurence Parsons
