= King's County (Parliament of Ireland constituency) =

Pre-1801 Irish constituency

- Former county constituency for the Irish House of Commons
- County: King's County

–1801
- Seats: 2
- Replaced by: King's County (UKHC)

King's County was a constituency represented in the Irish House of Commons until 1800. The county was renamed as County Offaly after Irish independence.

== Members of Parliament ==
- 1585: Sir George Bouchier and Henry Waring
- 1613–1615: Adam Loftus and Sir Francis Rushe
- 1634–1635: Sir William Colley and Terence Coghlan
- 1639–1649: John Coughlan and Sir William Parsons of Birr
- 1661–1666: John Weaver and Henry Lestrange

=== 1689–1801 ===
Election	First MP	Second MP	
1689	Heward Oxburgh	Owen Carrol	
1692	Sir Francis Blundell, 3rd Bt	Sir William Parsons	
1707	William Purefoy	Sir William Parsons	
1713	James Forth	John Moore	
1715	William Purefoy	Sir William Parsons, 2nd Bt	
1727	Colley Lyons	Sir William Parsons, 2nd Bt	
1741	Trevor Lloyd	Sir Laurence Parsons, 3rd Bt	
1748	Henry Lyons	Sir Laurence Parsons, 3rd Bt	
1757	Henry Lyons	Sir William Parsons, 4th Bt	
1768	John Lloyd	Sir William Parsons, 4th Bt	
1790	Denis Bowes Daly	Sir William Parsons, 4th Bt	
1791	Denis Bowes Daly	Sir Laurence Parsons, 5th Bt	Patriot
1801	Replaced by Westminster constituency King's County		
