= Parsons baronets =

Extinct baronetcy in the Baronetage of the United Kingdom

There have been four baronetcies created for people with the surname Parsons, two in the Baronetage of Ireland, one in the Baronetage of England and one in the Baronetage of the United Kingdom. One creation is still extant as of 2008.

== Bellamont (1620) ==
The Parsons Baronetcy, of Bellamont in the County of Dublin, was created in the Baronetage of Ireland on 10 November 1620. For more information on this creation, see the Earl of Rosse (1718 creation).

- Sir William Parsons, 1st Baronet of Bellamont (1570–1650)
  - Richard Parsons
- Sir William Parsons, 2nd Baronet of Bellamont (died 1658) grandson of the first baronet
- Sir Richard Parson, 3rd Baronet (c. 1657–1703) (created Viscount Rosse in 1681)

== Langley (1661) ==
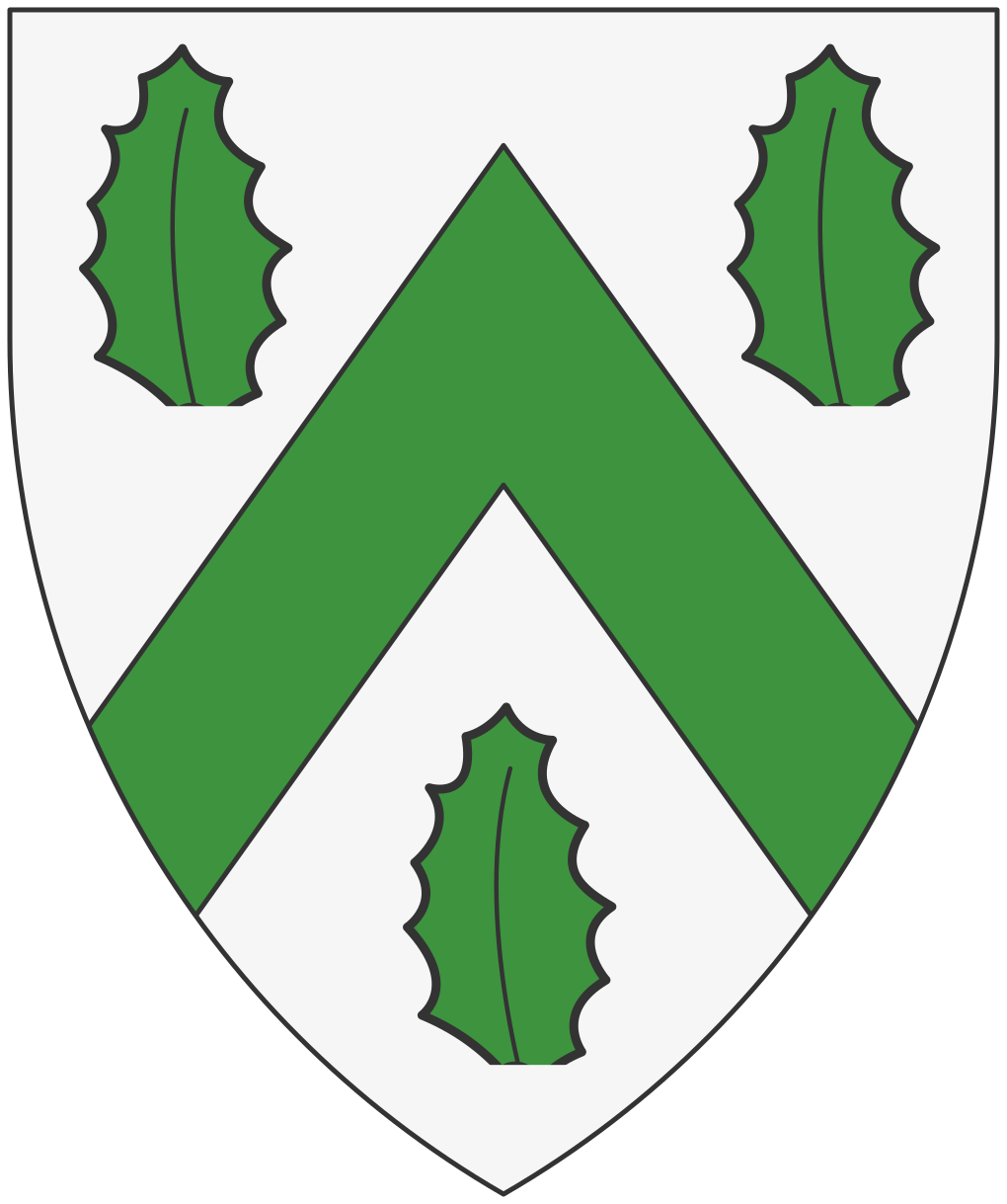
Arms of Parsons of Langley.

The Parsons Baronetcy, of Langley in the County of Buckingham, was created in the Baronetage of England on 9 April 1661 for William Parsons. The title became extinct on the death of the fourth Baronet in 1812.

- Sir William Parsons, 1st Baronet (c. 1636-c. 1662)
- Sir John Parsons, 2nd Baronet (c. 1656–1704)
- Sir William Parsons, 3rd Baronet (1686–1760)
- Sir Mark Parsons, 4th Baronet (c. 1741–1812), grandson of the 3rd Bt.

== Birr Castle (1677) ==
The Parsons Baronetcy, of Birr Castle in the King's County, was created in the Baronetage of Ireland on 15 December 1677. For more information on this creation, see the Earl of Rosse (1806 creation).

== Winton Lodge (1918) ==
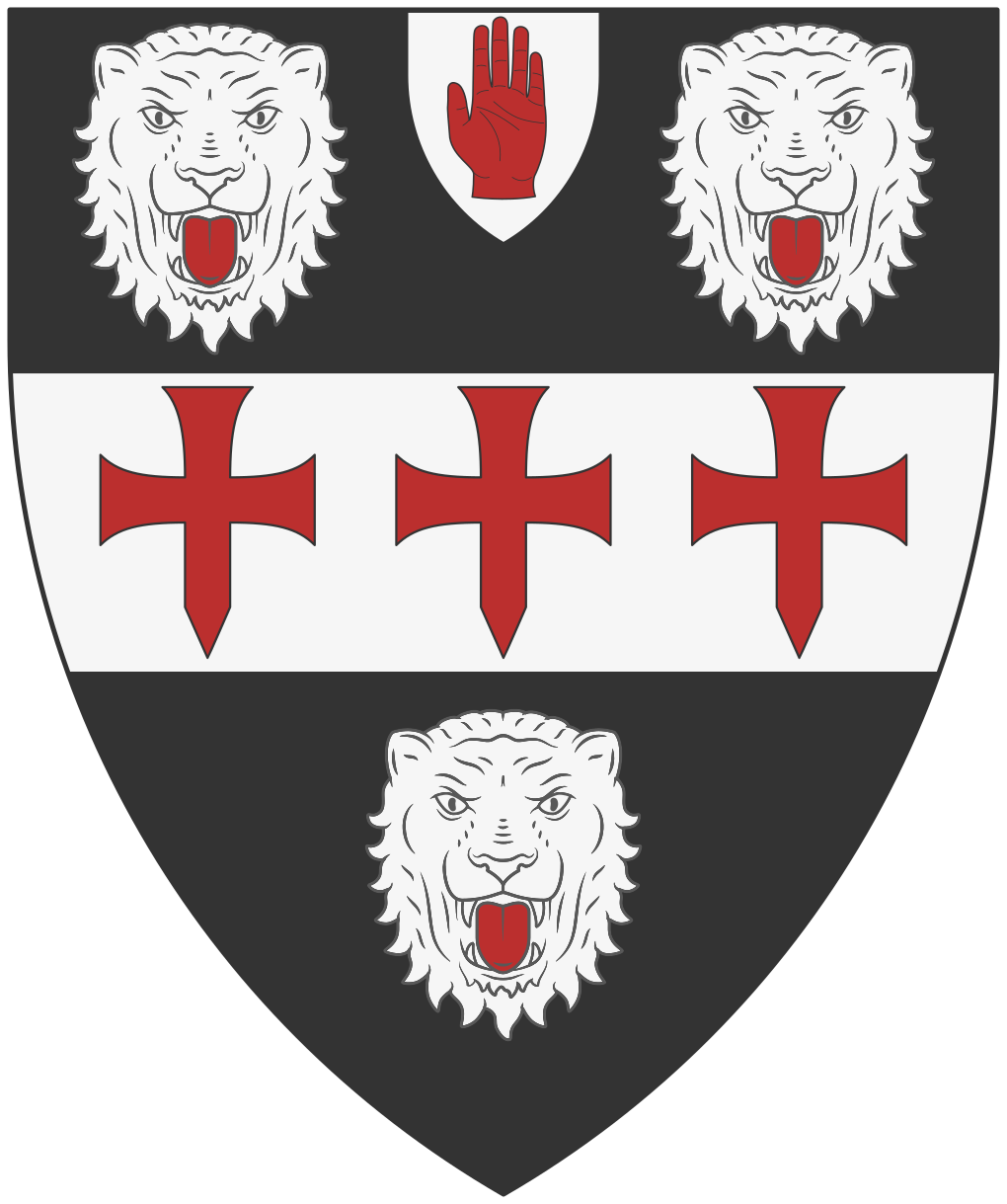
Arms of the Parsons of Winton Lodge.

The Parsons Baronetcy, of Winton Lodge in the County of Surrey, was created in the Baronetage of the United Kingdom on 24 June 1918 for Herbert James Francis Parsons. The title became extinct on his death in 1940.

- Sir Herbert James Francis Parsons, 1st Baronet (1870–1940)
