= John McCurdy =

John McCurdy may refer to:

- John Alexander Douglas McCurdy (1886–1961), lieutenant-governor of Nova Scotia and aviator
- John McCurdy (architect) (1824–1885), Irish architect
- John McCurdy (tennis) (born 1960), Australian tennis pro from the 1980s
- John McCurdy (baseball) born 1981, professional baseball player

== See also ==
- John Macurdy, born McCurdy, operatic singer
