= The Royal Masonic School for Girls =

Girls' school in Rickmansworth, Hertfordshire, England

Coordinates: 51°38′52″N 0°28′24″W

- Rickmansworth; United Kingdom

Information
- Type: Independent Girls' school
- Motto: Circumornatae ut similitudo templi "To be as the polished cornerstones of the temple"
- Established: 1788; 238 years ago
- Founder: Bartholomew Ruspini and others
- Grades: 1–13
- Colours: Navy and Purple
- Website: https://rmsforgirls.com/

The Royal Masonic School for Girls (RMS) is a private school in Rickmansworth, Hertfordshire, England, with day and boarding pupils. The school was instituted in 1788, with the aim of caring for the daughters of poor Freemasons. In 1978, the school opened to girls beyond the daughters of freemasons.

The school opened in 1789 with fifteen pupils in Somers Town, St Pancras, Middlesex. The school has moved between premises three times, twice within London and in 1934 to Rickmansworth in Hertfordshire, where it still is today.

The Royal Masonic School is a day school for girls 4–18 and a boarding school for girls 7–18. A nursery opened in 2009 for boys and girls aged 2–4 years.

== In the beginning ==
On 14 May 1788, a committee of Bartholomew Ruspini and nine other Freemasons met at the Freemasons' Tavern in Great Queen Street to plan the details of a charitable institution for the daughters of Masons who were struggling financially. A house at Somers Place East in Somers Town was taken in October as the premises of the institution at a rent of £35 per annum to house 15 children. The property has since disappeared but was between the present day Euston and St Pancras stations, near where the British Library is today.

Twenty replies for an advertisement for the matron were received, of which five were shortlisted. Ann Le Clerc was elected by ballot. She is referred to in the minutes of the meeting as a governess. It is unknown as to whether she was married or not.

On 5 January 1789, the children met at Ruspini's house and walked in procession to the house. The ceremonial procession was reported in the Morning Post (later to become absorbed by the Daily Telegraph) and the Daily Advertiser on 10 January.

The children could be from any part of the United Kingdom and had to be between the ages of six and nine. They had to be the daughters of Freemasons and were required to be in good health, having already had smallpox or cowpox and "be free from infirmity of deformity." At the end of their school life, girls were either returned to their family or supporters or apprenticed and supported until they could establish themselves.

== Location ==
The original location of the house in Somers town became too small with the addition of five new pupils at the end of the first year and another five after that. By 1790, discussion of finding a bigger site had begun. It was decided that a new building would be built. The place for the new school was St George's Fields, that is today 28 Westminster Bridge Road.

St John's Hill, Battersea Rise was the school's third location, purchased in 1853. It is unclear whether the school was in Battersea, Clapham, Wandsworth, or Putney when its address was written down. The school was still expanding; and in 1918, the junior girls moved to a new junior school in Weybridge, Surrey.

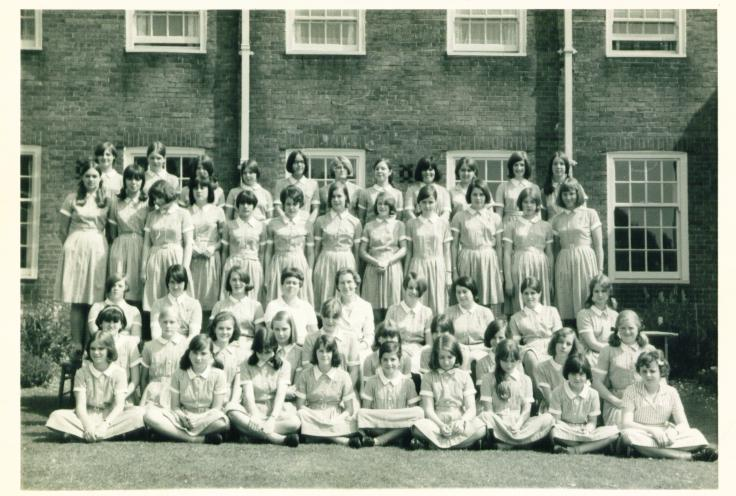
The girls of Alexandra house 1966

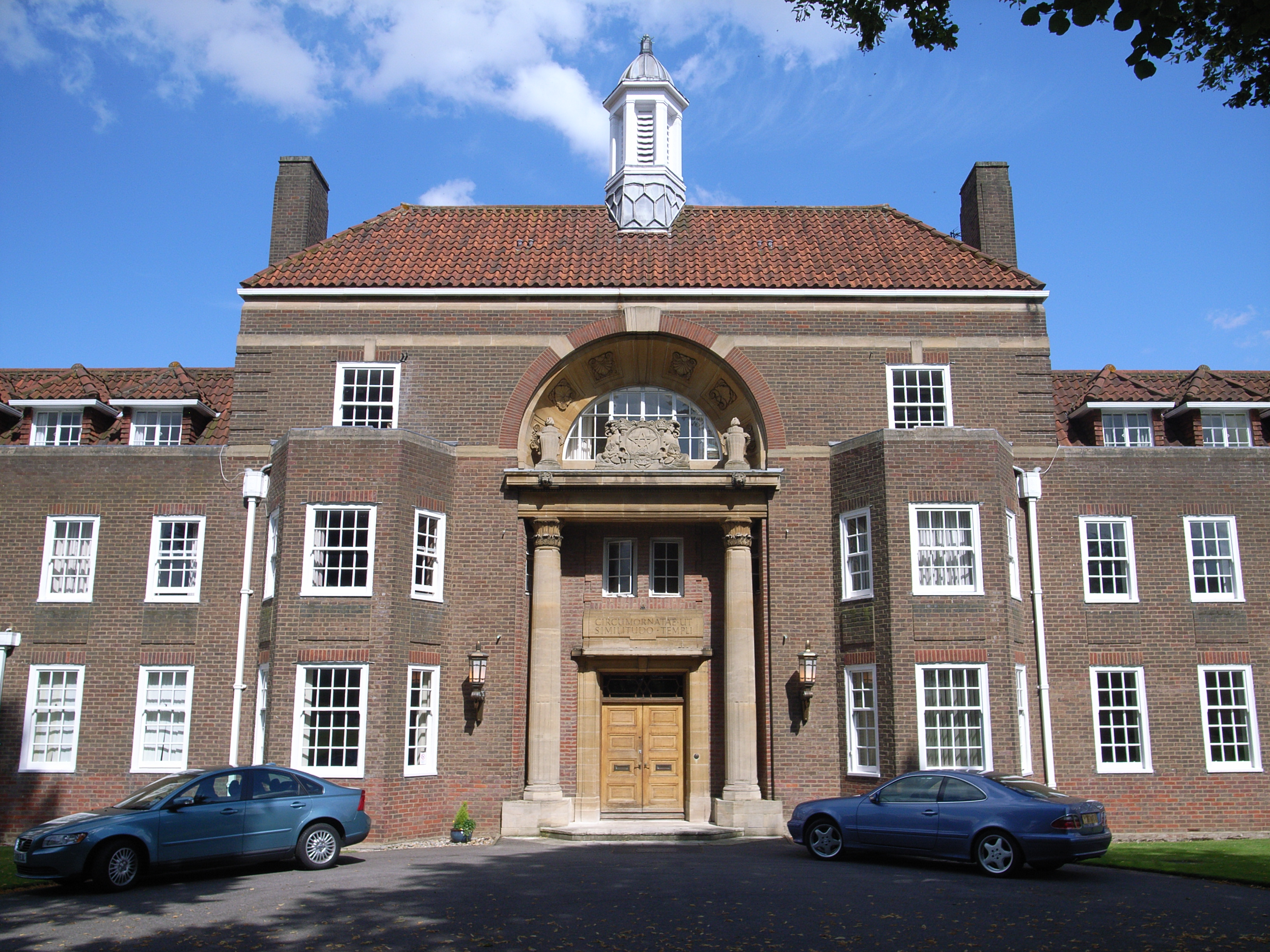
The front entrance of the current Rickmansworth school.

In June 1926, the school moved to a site in Rickmansworth comprising in 204 acres (0.83 km^{2}) of land with a mansion (although reports suggest this was in a state of disrepair.) John Leopold Denman, an architect from Brighton, won the commission to design the school.

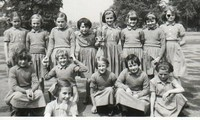
RMS Weybridge 1963

Originally, the Rickmansworth site was just for the senior girls (aged 12 and above). In 1973, the junior school moved from Weybridge to join the senior school in Rickmansworth.

== History ==
=== Food and clothing ===
A diet table was drawn up for the girls that was partly transcribed from other charities and partly based on the observations of Mr Boys, a governor and surgeon. The diet allowed a ration of 2 1/2 pounds of meat per child per week.

=== The war years ===
==== WWI ====
Life at the school continued normal during the first world war. Two exceptions include an incident in 1917 where the school was damaged by anti-aircraft fire, and 1919 when the girls gave up their prizes on prize day so that the money could be given to charity.

==== WWII ====
In order to protect the girls from the expected aerial bombardment, an air raid shelter had been dug out. This was behind the boarding house formerly known as Ruspini and now known as Alexandra. The shelter was commonly referred to as the trenches and consisted of tunnels that zig-zagged with a room at intervals for boiling a kettle or dispensing medicines. The tunnels were lined with benches 13 inches (330 mm) wide and each girl was allocated a place she must find in a raid.

They also adopted 3 ships, including the Ocean Courier. The girls knitted socks, gloves, and other items which were sent to the ship at Christmas. In return, Captain Crastion, the ship's captain, sent the school 36 pounds of toffee. The captain visited the school, and he and his ship also took part in the action on D-Day, carrying men and munitions.

=== Headmasters & Mistresses ===
- Sarah Louisa Davis—Head Governess—1861–1896
- Emily Redgrave—Head Governess—1896–?
- Maria Elizabeth Flintoff – 1911
- Elizabeth Hutchinson—Head Governess
- Florence Mason—matron and headmistress of the junior school—1915–1935
- Bertha Dean—1915–1938
- Mary Calway—1938–1940
- Audrey E Fryer—1941–1959
- Una Jessie Campbell—1959–1972
- Miss Jean Thompson—1972–1980
- David Curtis—1980–1991
- Irene Andrews—1991–2001
- Diana Rose—2001–2017
- Kevin Carson—2017–present

=== Film and TV ===
The school has been used as a filming location on a number of occasions for films and television, including Raiders of the Lost Ark, Supergirl, Indiana Jones and the Last Crusade and Me and Orson Welles and more recently Polite Society. Others include the children's TV series The Demon Headmaster, Inspector Morse, and EastEnders. It was the venue for "Skate Camp" on CBBC show, Skate Nation and on the Kevin Bishop show for British High School Musical.

== RMS Traditions ==
=== The School Badge ===
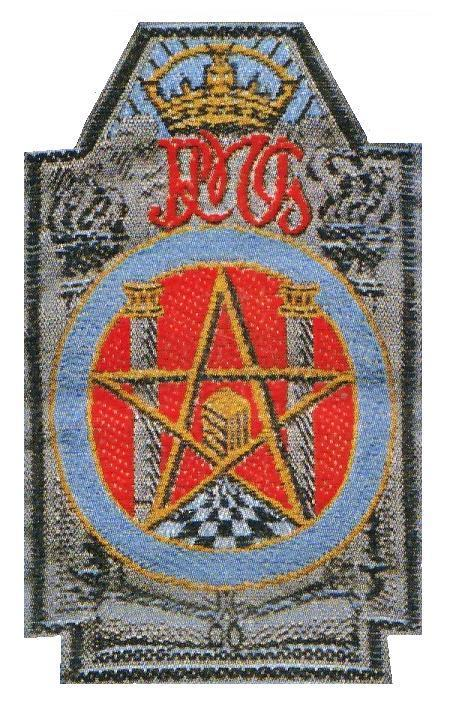
Traditional crest taken from a school bookmark

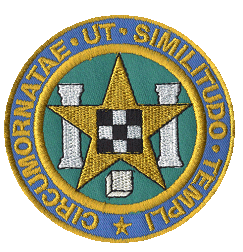
RMS Badge taken from a school blazer as from 1990

Two pillars are at each side of the design of the school badge. A five-pointed star is in the centre. At the bottom of the new badge, and centre of the old badge is the "smooth Ashlar". At the top of the old badge are the letters R.M.I.G standing for Royal Masonic Institution for Girls. On the new badge is the school motto, Circumornatae ut similitudo templi, which is the Vulgate version of a phrase from Psalm 144:12: "That our daughters may be as the polished corners of the temple".

=== School Drill ===
Some of the school drill originates in Swedish Drill, and some is based on callisthenics. When exercising began to be incorporated into girls' education there were no trained women P.E. teachers, so drilling was under the guidance of an Army drill instructor. The marching, counter marching and arm stretches were considered the only exercise suitable for a young lady.

It is unclear when school drill began. In an extract from the school magazine Machio in 1962, school drill is purported to be a hundred years old. There is a reference to it in an account of prize day 1876 although it is not referred to as drill.

It was performed to music on a piano, later 2 grand pianos, and consisted of 180 girls (the number of degrees in a semicircle). In 1980, the music was recorded and the spoken commands gave way to a whistle. The girls learn their positions (based on their height, and thus changing from year to year and needing to be re-learned) and move in time to the music from one point to the next. The end of the performance is marked by the girls producing the Masonic emblem of set square and compass, and the point, the smallest child in the performance marching forward alone to complete the symbol.

In 2012, 10 pupils appeared on the BBC's The One Show for a live performance of Drill.

=== Ashlar ===
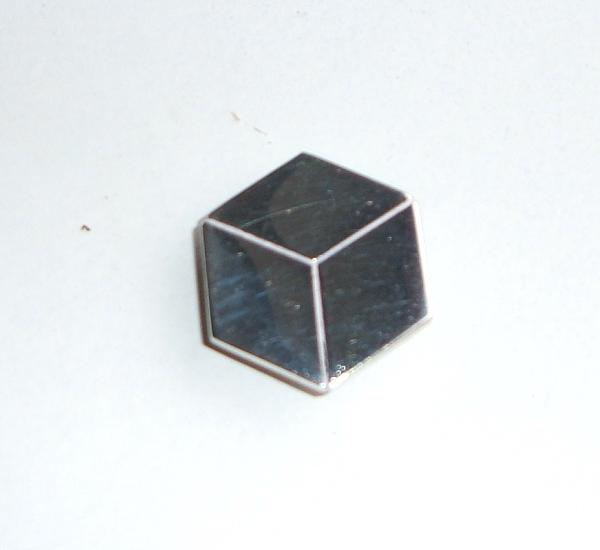
The Ashlar silver badge of the RMS School.

The Ashlar is the silver badge that RMS may achieve by the end of Year 11. The award of the Ashlar shows that a girl has been recognised for her contribution to school life, her sense of personal responsibility and her responsibility to others.

== RMS Today ==
The school follows the UK national curriculum with students taking their GCSEs at age 16 and A-Levels at 18.

== Notable former pupils ==
- Amelia Warner, actress
- Sophia La Porta, actress
- Wendy Richard, actress
- Baroness Barbara Mills KC, the first black woman elected as Chair of the Bar Council

== See also ==
- Masonic Female Orphan School of Ireland
