= Stan Polden =

Irish rugby union player

- Full name: Stanhope Ernest Polden
- Born: 24 March 1885 Dublin, Ireland
- Died: 14 October 1958 (aged 73) Dublin, Ireland
- School: Masonic Boys School

Rugby union career
- Position: Scrum-half
International career
Years	Team	Apps	(Points)
1913–20	Ireland	4	(0)

Stanhope Ernest Polden (24 March 1885 – 14 October 1958) was an Irish international rugby union player.

Polden was born and raised in Dublin, where he received his education at the Masonic Boys School.

A scrum-half, Polden was a long time member of Clontarf F.C. and gained Ireland caps both sides of World War I. He received four caps, making his debut in 1913, then appearing for the last time in 1920, at the late age of 35.

Polden became an IRFU committeeman and was president in 1933–34.

Outside of rugby, Polden served on the Dublin Port and Docks Board. He was also involved in the Masonic Order as a representative of the Masonic Lodge of Massachusetts in Ireland.

== See also ==
- List of Ireland national rugby union players
