= 2002 Major League Baseball draft =

Baseball draft of amateur players by Major League Baseball

General information
- Date: June 4–5, 2002

Overview
- First selection: Bryan Bullington; Pittsburgh Pirates

The 2002 Major League Baseball draft, was held on June 4 and 5.

It is featured in Michael Lewis' 2003 book Moneyball.

== First round selections ==
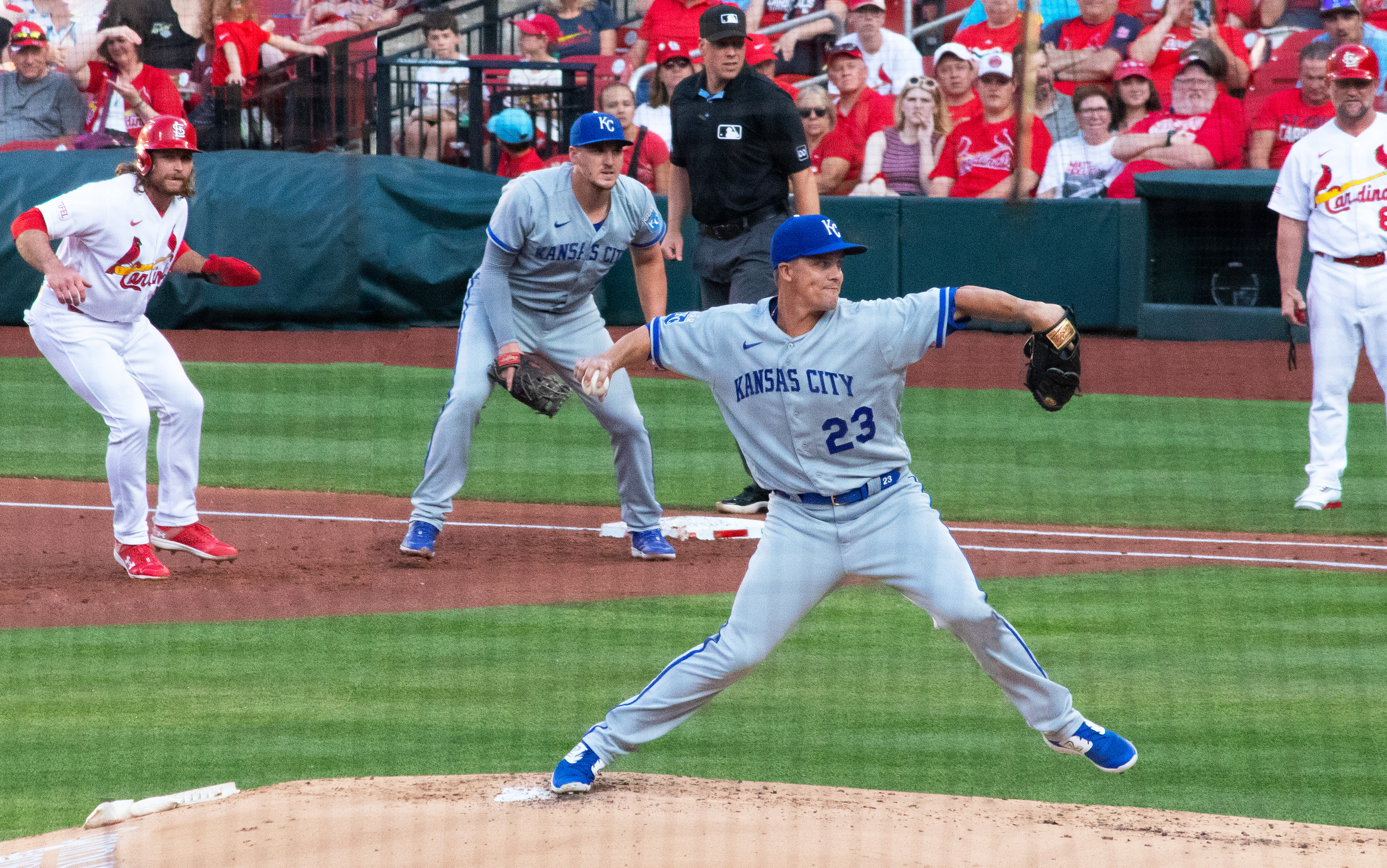
The Royals selected Zack Greinke sixth overall. The 6× All-Star is a 6× Gold Glove winner at pitcher, 2× Silver Slugger at pitcher, 2× ERA leader, and the 2009 Cy Young Award winner.

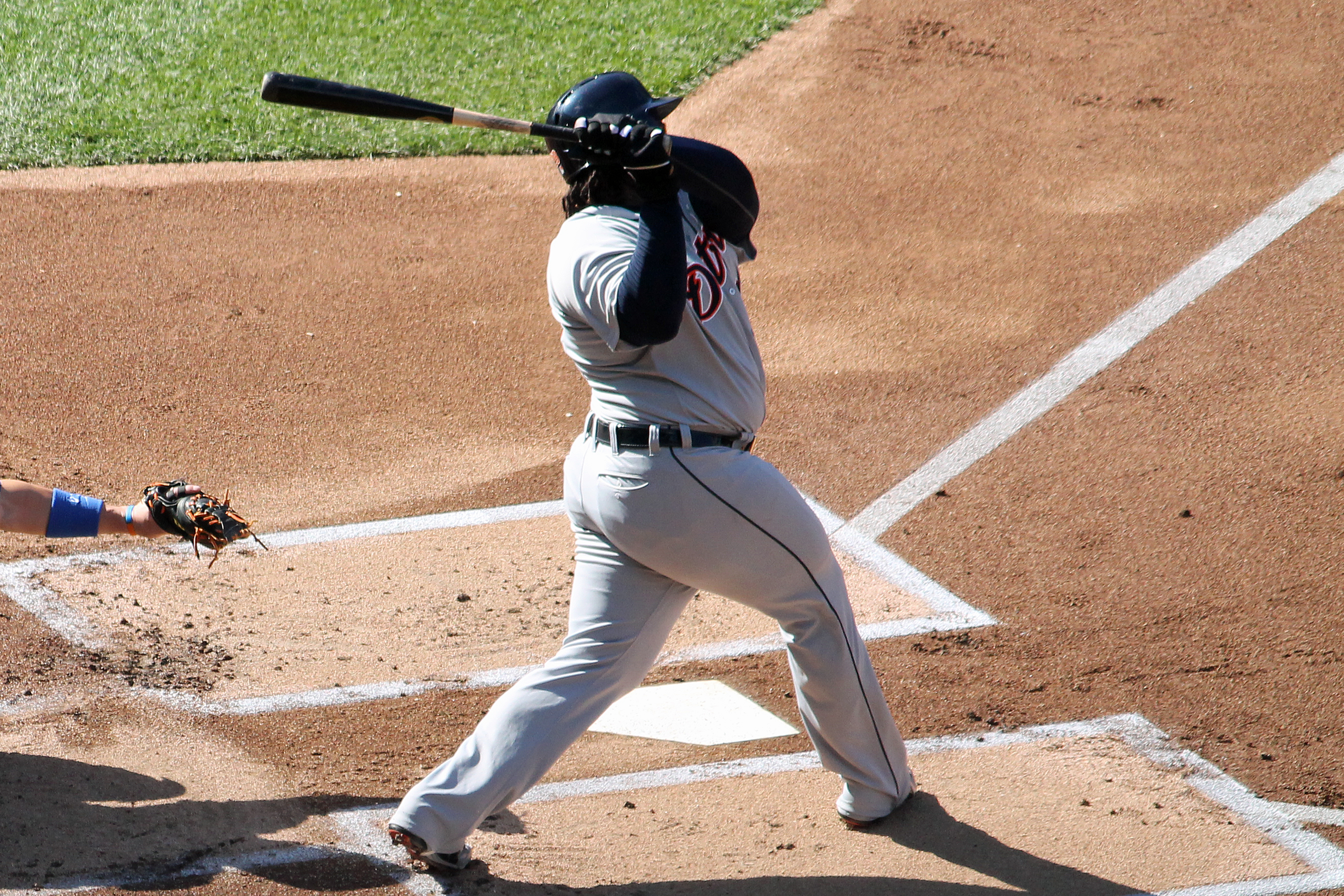
The Brewers selected Prince Fielder 7th overall. Fielder is a 6× All-Star, 3× Silver Slugger at first base, and led the National League in home runs in 2007.

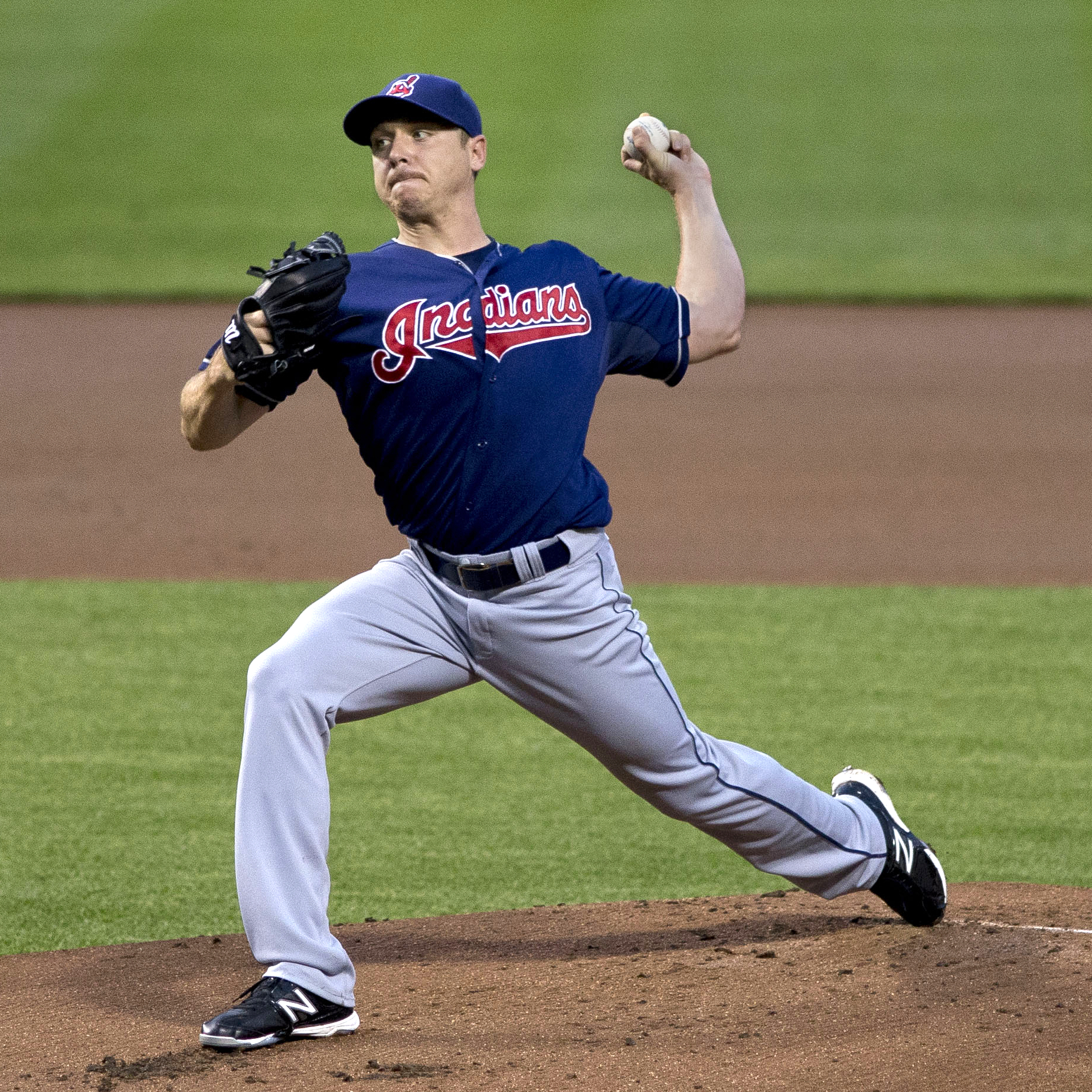
The Mets selected Scott Kazmir 15th overall. Kazmir is a 3× All-Star and led the American League in strikeouts in 2007.

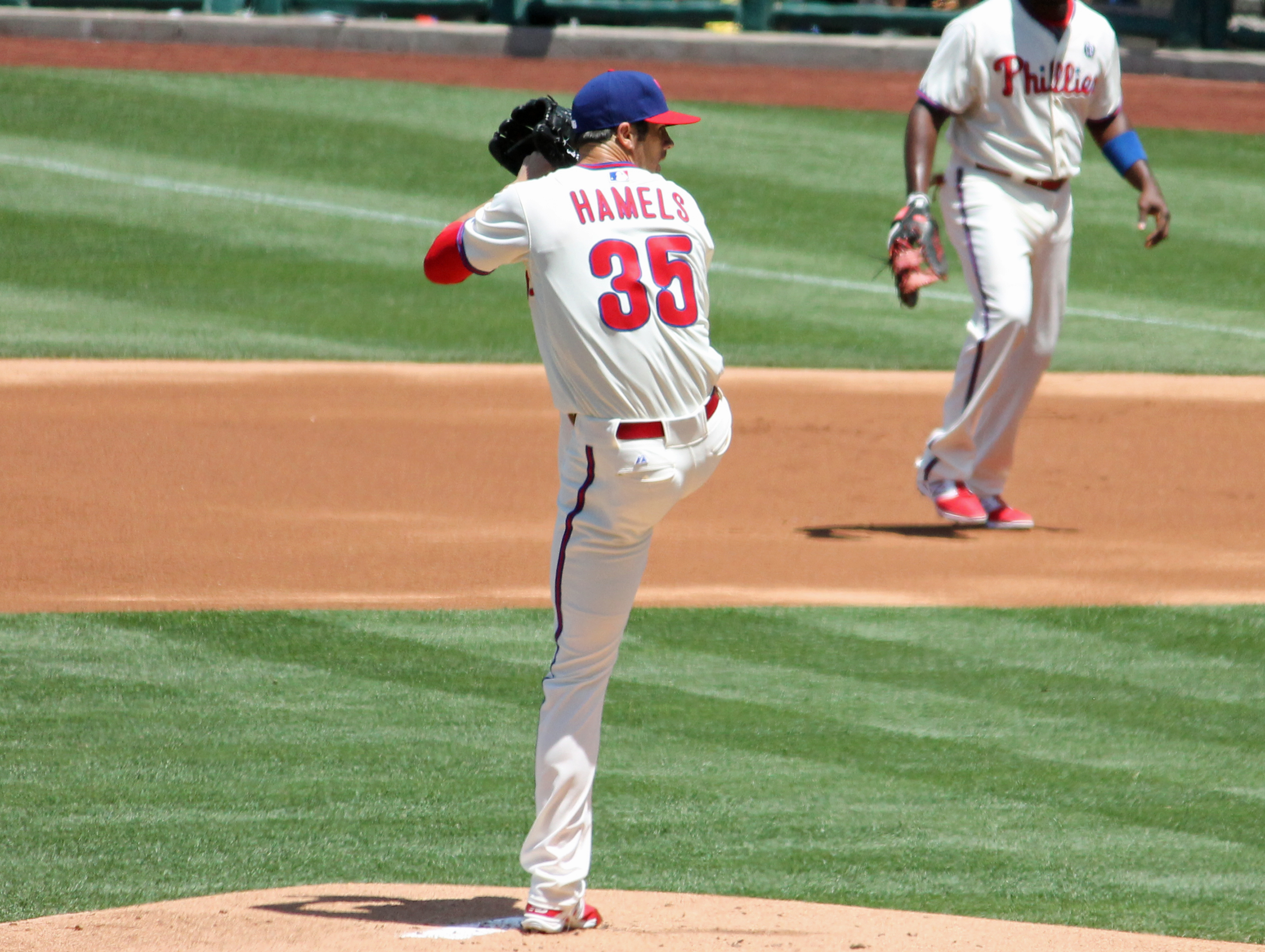
The Phillies selected Cole Hamels 17th overall. In 2008, the 4× All-Star led the Phillies to a World Series championship and was named World Series MVP.

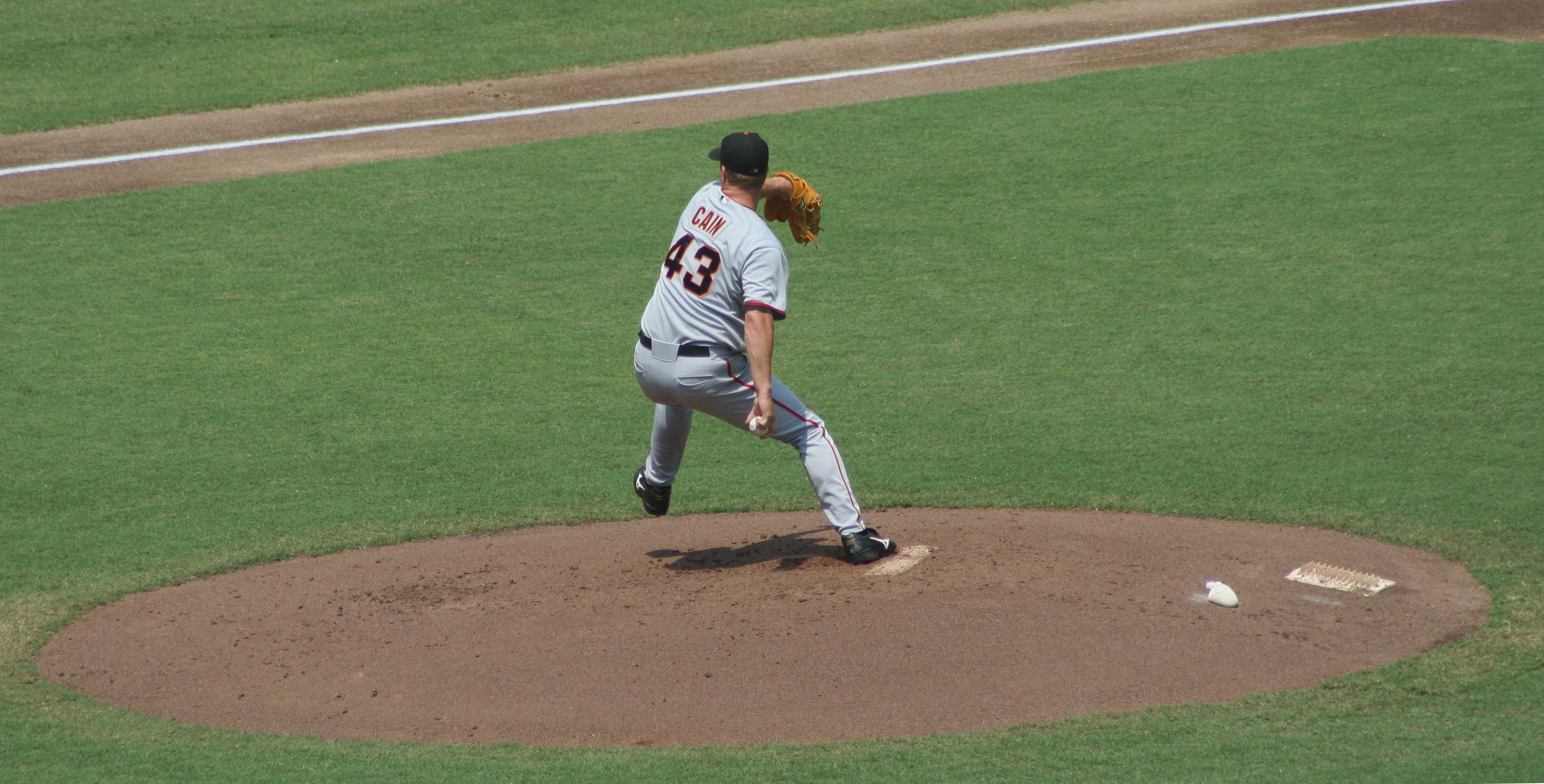
The San Francisco Giants selected Matt Cain 25th overall. The 3× All-Star, pitched a perfect game in 2012, and won the World Series in 2010, and 2012.

= All-Star

Pick	Player	Team	Position	School
1	Bryan Bullington	Pittsburgh Pirates	RHP	Ball State
2	B. J. Upton	Tampa Bay Devil Rays	CF	Greenbrier Christian Academy (VA)
3	Chris Gruler	Cincinnati Reds	RHP	Liberty High School (CA)
4	Adam Loewen	Baltimore Orioles	LHP	Fraser Valley Christian High School (BC)
5	Clint Everts	Montreal Expos	RHP	Cypress Falls High School (TX)
6	Zack Greinke	Kansas City Royals	RHP	Apopka High School (FL)
7	Prince Fielder	Milwaukee Brewers	1B	Eau Gallie High School (FL)
8	Scott Moore	Detroit Tigers	SS	Cypress High School (CA)
9	Jeff Francis	Colorado Rockies	LHP	University of British Columbia
10	Drew Meyer	Texas Rangers	SS/2B	South Carolina
11	Jeremy Hermida	Florida Marlins	OF	Wheeler High School (GA)
12	Joe Saunders	Anaheim Angels	LHP	Virginia Tech
13	Khalil Greene	San Diego Padres	SS	Clemson
14	Russ Adams	Toronto Blue Jays	SS	North Carolina
15	Scott Kazmir	New York Mets	LHP	Cypress Falls High School (TX)
16	Nick Swisher	Oakland Athletics (Note: Pick from Boston Red Sox as compensation for signing of free agent Johnny Damon)	1B	Ohio State
17	Cole Hamels	Philadelphia Phillies	LHP	Rancho Bernardo High School (CA)
18	Royce Ring	Chicago White Sox	LHP	San Diego State
19	James Loney	Los Angeles Dodgers	1B	Elkins High School (TX)
20	Denard Span	Minnesota Twins	OF	Tampa Catholic High School (FL)
21	Bobby Brownlie	Chicago Cubs	RHP	Rutgers
22	Jeremy Guthrie	Cleveland Indians	RHP	Stanford
23	Jeff Francoeur	Atlanta Braves	OF	Parkview High School (GA)
24	Joe Blanton	Oakland Athletics (Note: Pick from New York Yankees as compensation for signing of free agent Jason Giambi)	RHP	Kentucky
25	Matt Cain	San Francisco Giants	RHP	Houston High School (TN)
26	John McCurdy	Oakland Athletics	SS	Maryland
27	Sergio Santos	Arizona Diamondbacks	SS	Mater Dei High School (CA)
28	John Mayberry Jr.*	Seattle Mariners	1B	Rockhurst High School (MO)
29	Derick Grigsby	Houston Astros	RHP	Northeast Texas Community College
30	Ben Fritz	Oakland Athletics (Note: Pick from St. Louis Cardinals as compensation for signing of free agent Jason Isringhausen)	RHP	Fresno State

== Supplemental first round compensation selections ==
Pick	Player	Team	Position	School
31	Greg Miller	Los Angeles Dodgers (Note: Supplemental pick for loss of free agent Chan Ho Park)	LHP	Esperanza High School (CA)
32	Luke Hagerty	Chicago Cubs (Note: Supplemental pick for loss of free agent David Weathers)	LHP	Ball State
33	Matt Whitney	Cleveland Indians (Note: Supplemental pick for loss of free agent Juan Gonzalez)	1B	Palm Beach Gardens Community High School (FL)
34	Dan Meyer	Atlanta Braves (Note: Supplemental pick for loss of free agent Steve Karsay)	LHP	James Madison
35	Jeremy Brown	Oakland Athletics (Note: Supplemental pick for loss of free agent Jason Giambi)	C	Alabama
36	Chadd Blasko	Chicago Cubs (Note: Supplemental pick for loss of free agent Rondell White)	RHP	Purdue
37	Steve Obenchain	Oakland Athletics (Note: Supplemental pick for loss of free agent Jason Isringhausen)	RHP	Evansville
38	Matt Clanton	Chicago Cubs (Note: Supplemental pick for loss of free agent Todd Van Poppel)	RHP	Orange Coast College
39	Mark Teahen	Oakland Athletics (Note: Supplemental pick for loss of free agent Johnny Damon)	3B	Saint Mary's
40	Mark Schramek	Cincinnati Reds (Note: Supplemental pick for failure to sign 2001 No. 1 choice Jeremy Sowers)	RHP	Texas
41	Micah Schilling	Cleveland Indians (Note: Supplemental pick for failure to sign 2001 No.1 choice Alan Horne)	2B	Silliman Institute

- *Did Not Sign With Team

== Background ==
The Pittsburgh Pirates selected 21-year-old right-handed pitcher Bryan Bullington with the first overall pick in the 2002 First-Year Player Draft. The 6'5", 225-pound hurler was ranked by Baseball America as having the best breaking ball and best command among all college pitchers.

In his three-year career at Ball State, Bullington posted a 29–11 record, 13 complete games and a 3.36 ERA in 46 games (42 starts). He is the university's all-time leader in strikeouts (357) and was a member of the 2001 USA National team. As a freshman, Bullington garnered all-conference honors and led the MAC in strikeouts. He was also named MAC Pitcher-of-the-Year for 2001 and 2002. Bullington set a MAC record in strikeouts and led the league in victories and ERA in 2002.

Other notable selections in the first round included Prince Fielder (Brewers), son of former Major Leaguer Cecil Fielder; and John Mayberry Jr. (Mariners), son of former Major Leaguer John Mayberry.

This draft was discussed at length in the Michael Lewis book Moneyball: The Art of Winning an Unfair Game, which analyzed Oakland Athletics general manager Billy Beane's approach to player scouting and development.

== Other notable players ==
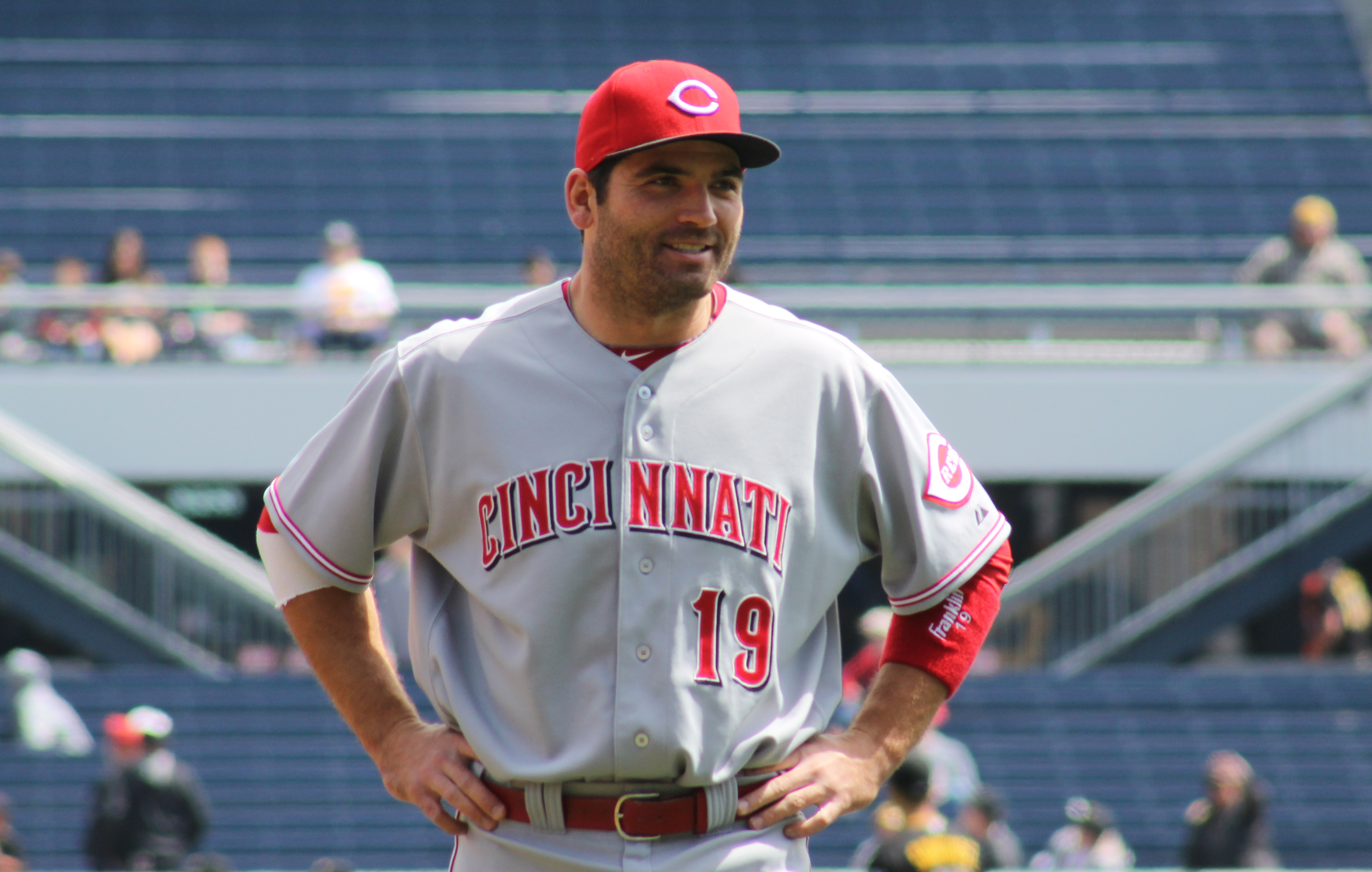
The Reds selected Joey Votto in the 2nd round. The 6× All-Star won the 2010 National League MVP Award.

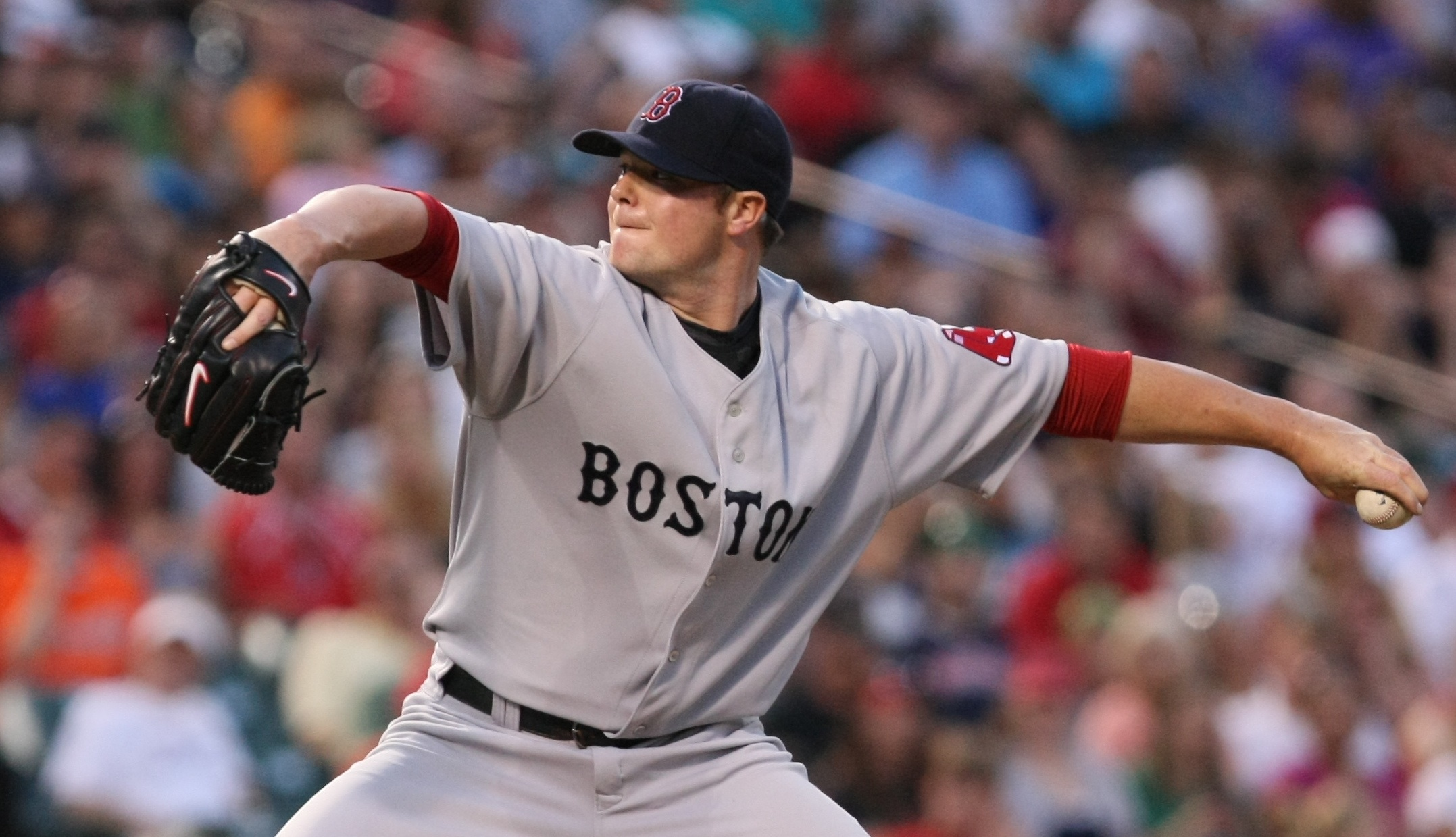
The Red Sox selected Jon Lester in the 2nd round. A 5× All-Star, he is a 3× World Series champion.

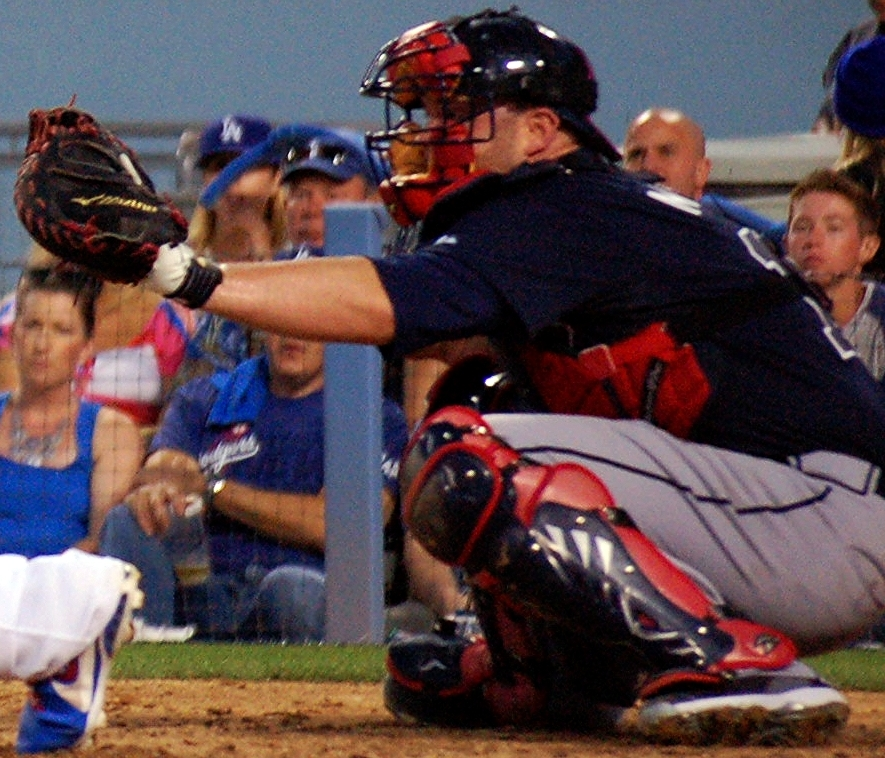
The Braves selected Brian McCann in the 2nd round. McCann is a 7× All-Star and 6× Silver Slugger at catcher.

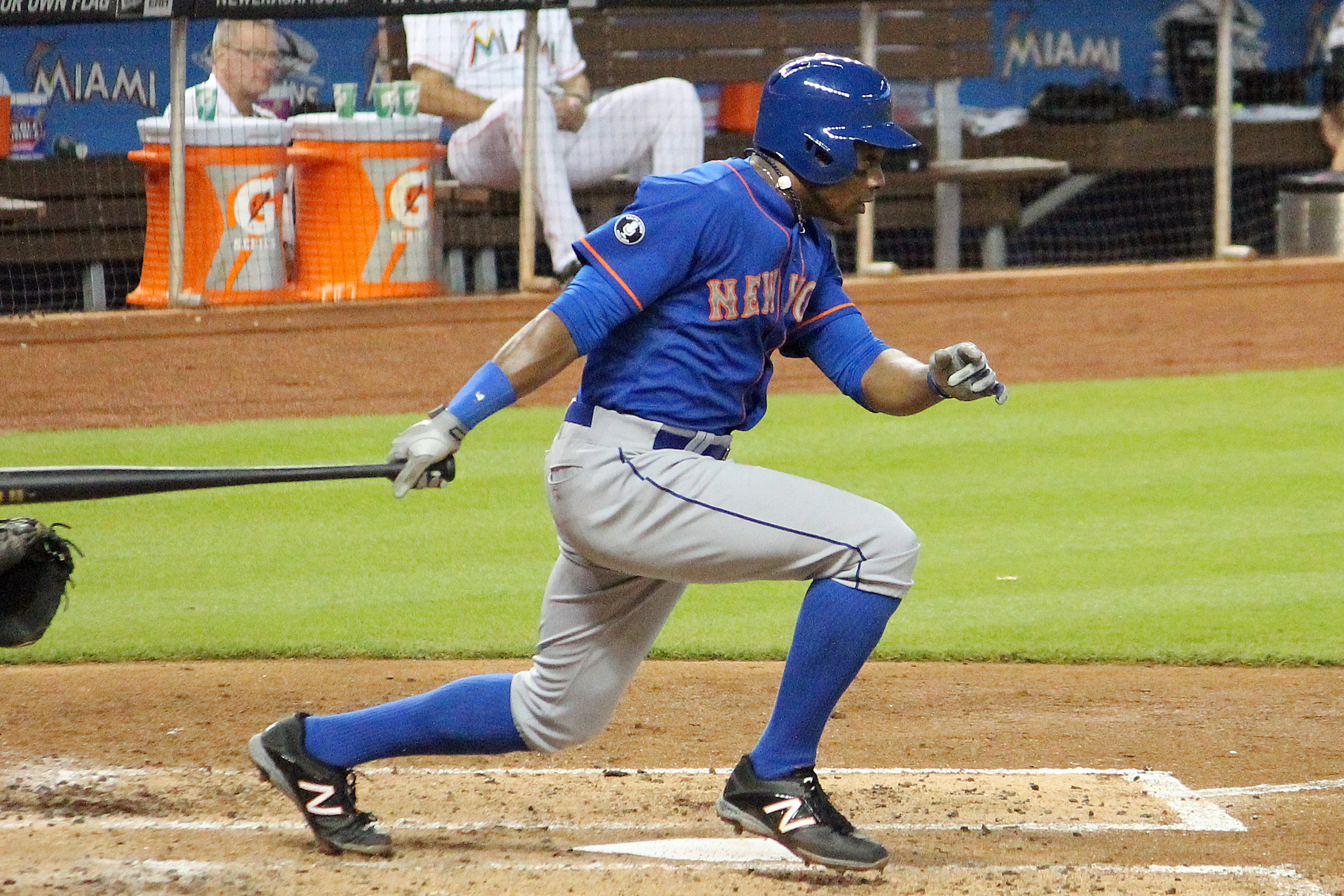
The Tigers selected Curtis Granderson in the 3rd Round. He is a 3× All-Star and a 2011 Silver Slugger as an outfielder.

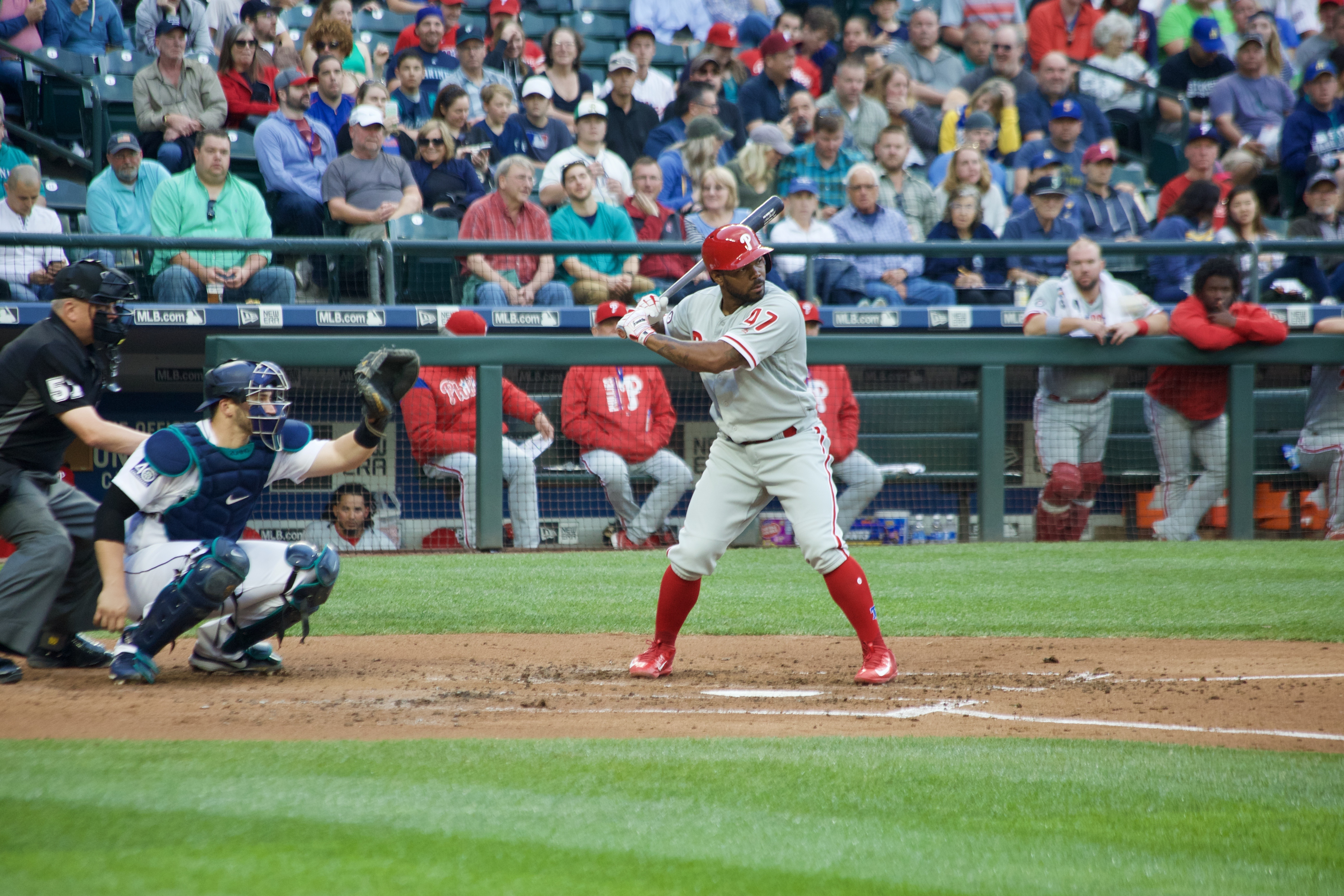
The Angels selected Howie Kendrick in the 10th Round. A 2011 All-Star, He helped lead the Nationals to the 2019 World Series championship.

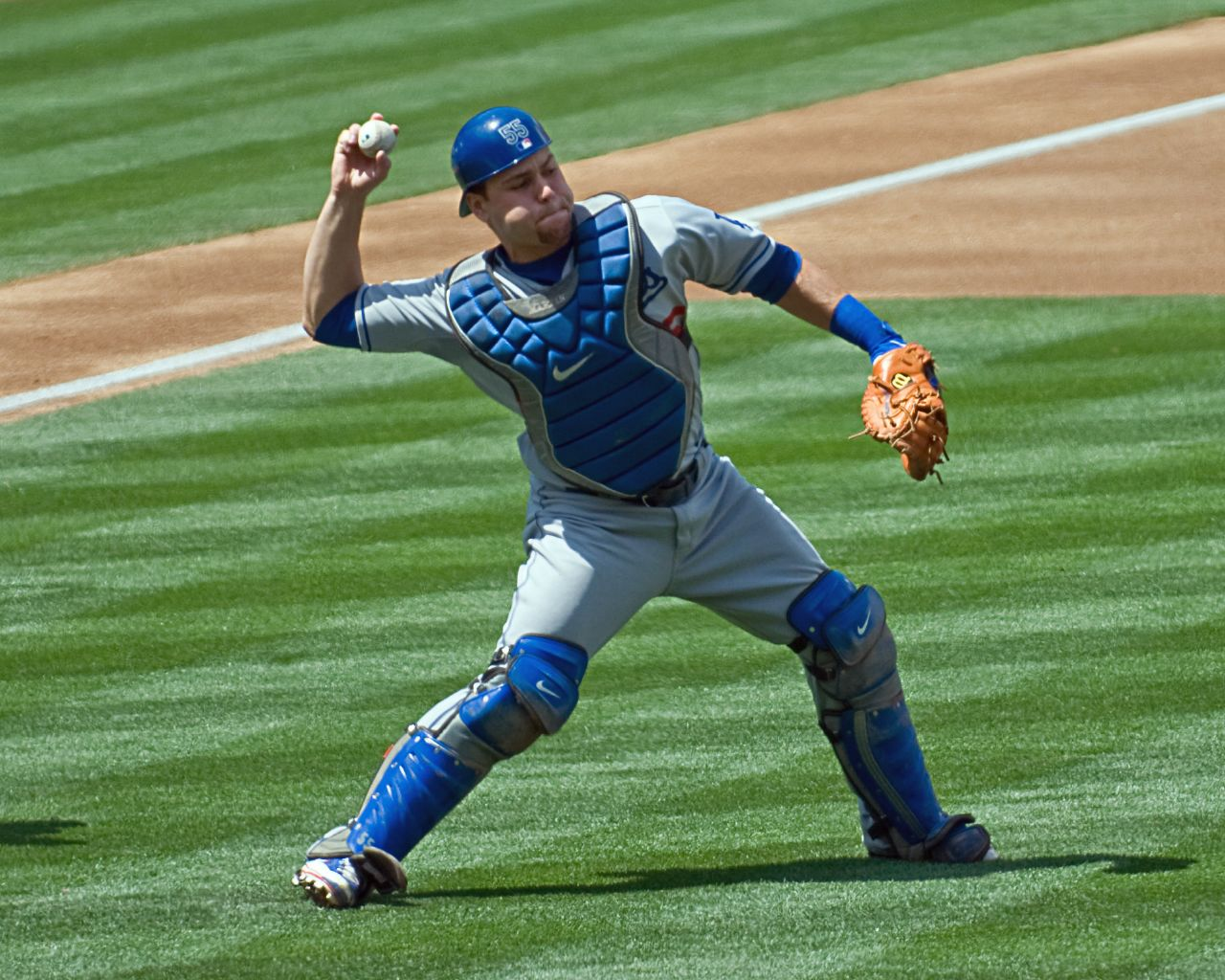
The Dodgers selected Russell Martin in the 17th round. Martin is a 4× All-Star who in 2007 won the Silver Slugger and Gold Glove at catcher.

- Joey Votto, 2nd round, 44th overall by the Cincinnati Reds
- Micah Owings, 2nd round, 50th overall by the Colorado Rockies
- Jon Lester, 2nd round, 57th overall by the Boston Red Sox
- Jonathan Broxton, 2nd round, 60th overall by the Los Angeles Dodgers
- Jesse Crain, 2nd round, 61st overall by the Minnesota Twins
- Brian McCann, 2nd round, 64th overall by the Atlanta Braves
- Fred Lewis, 2nd round, 66th overall by the San Francisco Giants
- Chris Snyder, 2nd round, 68th overall by the Arizona Diamondbacks
- Curtis Granderson, 3rd round, 80th overall by the Detroit Tigers
- Charlie Morton, 3rd round, 95th overall by the Atlanta Braves
- Jeff Baker, 4th round, 111th overall by the Colorado Rockies
- Rich Hill, 4th round, 112th overall by the Chicago Cubs
- Josh Johnson, 4th round, 113th overall by the Florida Marlins
- Kevin Correia, 4th round, 127th overall by the San Francisco Giants
- Nick Hundley, 5th round, 143rd overall by the Florida Marlins, but did not sign
- Ben Francisco, 5th round, 154th overall by the Cleveland Indians
- John Maine, 6th round, 166th overall by the Baltimore Orioles
- Scott Olsen, 6th round, 173rd overall by the Florida Marlins
- Chris Getz, 6th round, 180th overall by the Chicago White Sox
- Pat Neshek, 6th round, 182nd overall by the Minnesota Twins
- Matt Capps, 7th round, 193rd overall by the Pittsburgh Pirates
- Tom Wilhelmsen, 7th round, 199th overall by the Milwaukee Brewers
- Ryan Spilborghs, 7th round, 201st overall by the Colorado Rockies
- Brandon Moss, 8th round, 238th overall by the Boston Red Sox
- Adam Lind, 8th round, 242nd overall by the Minnesota Twins, but did not sign
- Clay Hensley, 8th round, 247th overall by the San Francisco Giants
- Jared Burton, 8th round, 248th overall by the Oakland Athletics
- Adam Greenberg, 9th round, 273rd overall by the Chicago Cubs
- Jason Hammel, 10th round, 284th overall by the Tampa Bay Devil Rays
- Howie Kendrick, 10th round, 294th overall by the Anaheim Angels
- Matt Lindstrom, 10th round, 297th overall by the New York Mets
- Joel Zumaya, 11th round, 320th overall by the Detroit Tigers
- James McDonald, 11th round, 331st overall by the Los Angeles Dodgers
- John Schneider, 13th round, 386th overall by the Toronto Blue Jays
- Micah Hoffpauir, 13th round, 393rd overall by the Chicago Cubs
- Mike Pelfrey, 15th round, 434th overall by the Tampa Bay Devil Rays, but did not sign
- Gaby Sánchez, 15th round, 460th overall by the Tampa Bay Devil Rays, but did not sign
- Brandon McCarthy, 17th round, 510th overall by the Chicago White Sox
- Russell Martin, 17th round, 511th overall by the Los Angeles Dodgers
- Chris Young, 18th round, 531st overall by the Colorado Rockies
- Chris Denorfia, 19th round, 555th overall by the Cincinnati Reds
- Kameron Loe, 20th round, 592nd overall by the Texas Rangers
- George Kottaras, 20th round, 595th overall by the San Diego Padres
- Boone Logan, 20th round, 600th overall by the Chicago White Sox
- Andy LaRoche, 21st round, 625th overall by the San Diego Padres, but did not sign
- Travis Ishikawa, 21st round, 637th overall by the San Francisco Giants
- Jacoby Ellsbury, 23rd round, 674th overall by the Tampa Bay Rays, but did not sign
- Kyle McClellan, 25th round, 762nd overall by the St. Louis Cardinals
- Craig Breslow, 26th round, 769th overall by the Milwaukee Brewers
- Phil Coke, 26th round, 786th overall by the New York Yankees
- Brad Ziegler, 31st round, 938th overall by the Oakland Athletics, but did not sign
- Nyjer Morgan, 33rd round, 973rd overall by the Pittsburgh Pirates
- Tony Sipp, 33rd round, 990th overall by the Chicago White Sox, but did not sign
- Ricky Romero, 37th round, 1108th overall by the Boston Red Sox, but did not sign
- Randy Wells, 38th round, 1143rd overall by the Chicago Cubs
- Luke Hochevar, 39th round, 1171st overall by the Los Angeles Dodgers, but did not sign
- Bryan LaHair, 39th round, 1180th overall by the Seattle Mariners
- Hunter Pence, 40th round, 1189th overall by the Milwaukee Brewers, but did not sign
- Matt Garza, 40th round, 1191st overall by the Colorado Rockies, but did not sign
- Jonathan Papelbon, 40th round, 1208th overall by the Oakland Athletics, but did not sign
- Scott Feldman, 41st round, 1241st overall by the Houston Astros, but did not sign
- Jesse Chavez, 42nd round, 1252nd overall by the Texas Rangers
- Brian Bannister, 45th round, 1342nd overall by the Boston Red Sox, but did not sign

== NFL players drafted ==
- Brandon Weeden, 2nd round, 71st overall by the New York Yankees
- Brandon Jones, 42nd round, 1,270 overall by the Seattle Mariners, but did not sign
- John Stocco, 45th round, 1,346th overall by the Minnesota Twins, but did not sign

Preceded by Joe Mauer	1st Overall Picks; Bryan Bullington	Succeeded by Delmon Young
