= Masonic Boys School, Dublin =

Former school in Dublin, Ireland (1867–1981)

Masonic Boys School
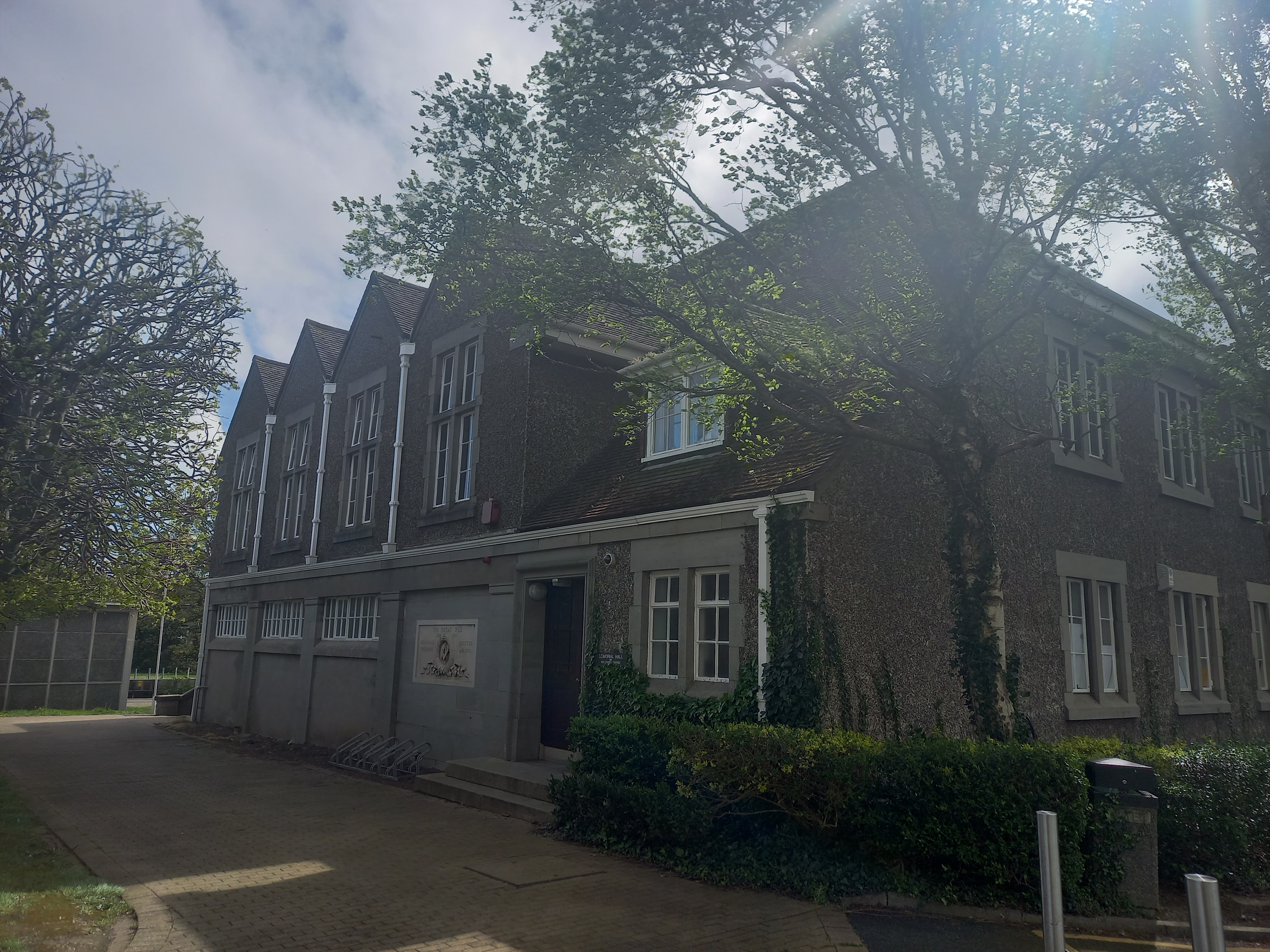

Location
- Clonskeagh, Dublin; Ireland
- Coordinates: 53.3113°N 6.2364°W

Information
- Established: 1867
- Closed: 1980
- Gender: Male

The Masonic Boys School (sometimes Masonic Orphan Boys School) was a school in Dublin, Ireland which was originally established for the sons of deceased, or financially distressed, freemasons. It was directly supported by the Brethren of the Masonic Order and was in existence from 1867 until 1981.

The school was located at Richview in Clonskeagh for most of its existence from 1885 to 1980 in what is as of 2023 the University College Dublin's School of Architecture.

== History ==
Following the earlier establishment of the Masonic Female Orphan School of Ireland, the establishment of a boys school was decided upon at a meeting in Freemason's Hall on Molesworth Street on 16 April 1867.

=== Sport at the school ===
The school won the Leinster Cricket Union Senior schools cup on a number of occasions in its history.

The school were runners-up in the Leinster Schools Junior Cup in Rugby on one occasion in 1927.

== School campus ==
=== Adelaide Hall, Sandymount ===
The school was established in 1867 and originally operated from Adelaide Hall in Sandymount which it leased from 1873 but moved because of overcrowding to a new site at Richview Lodge in Clonskeagh in 1885.

=== Richview, Clonskeagh ===
After some alterations and extensions of Richview Lodge in the 1880s by the architect Sir Thomas Drew, the school finally commenced for the first time from the new campus at Richview, Clonskeagh on 16 January 1888.

In 1980, UCD bought Richview Lodge and its estate of 17.4 acres for £2.1million and the school closed soon after.

== Notable alumni ==
- Alan Buchanan - Anglican bishop
- George Campbell RHA - painter
- Derek Fielding - author
- Edward Seymour - cricketer
- James Wills - cricketer
- Stan Polden - Irish rugby player

== See also ==
- Grand Lodge of Ireland
