= Masonic Female Orphan School of Ireland =

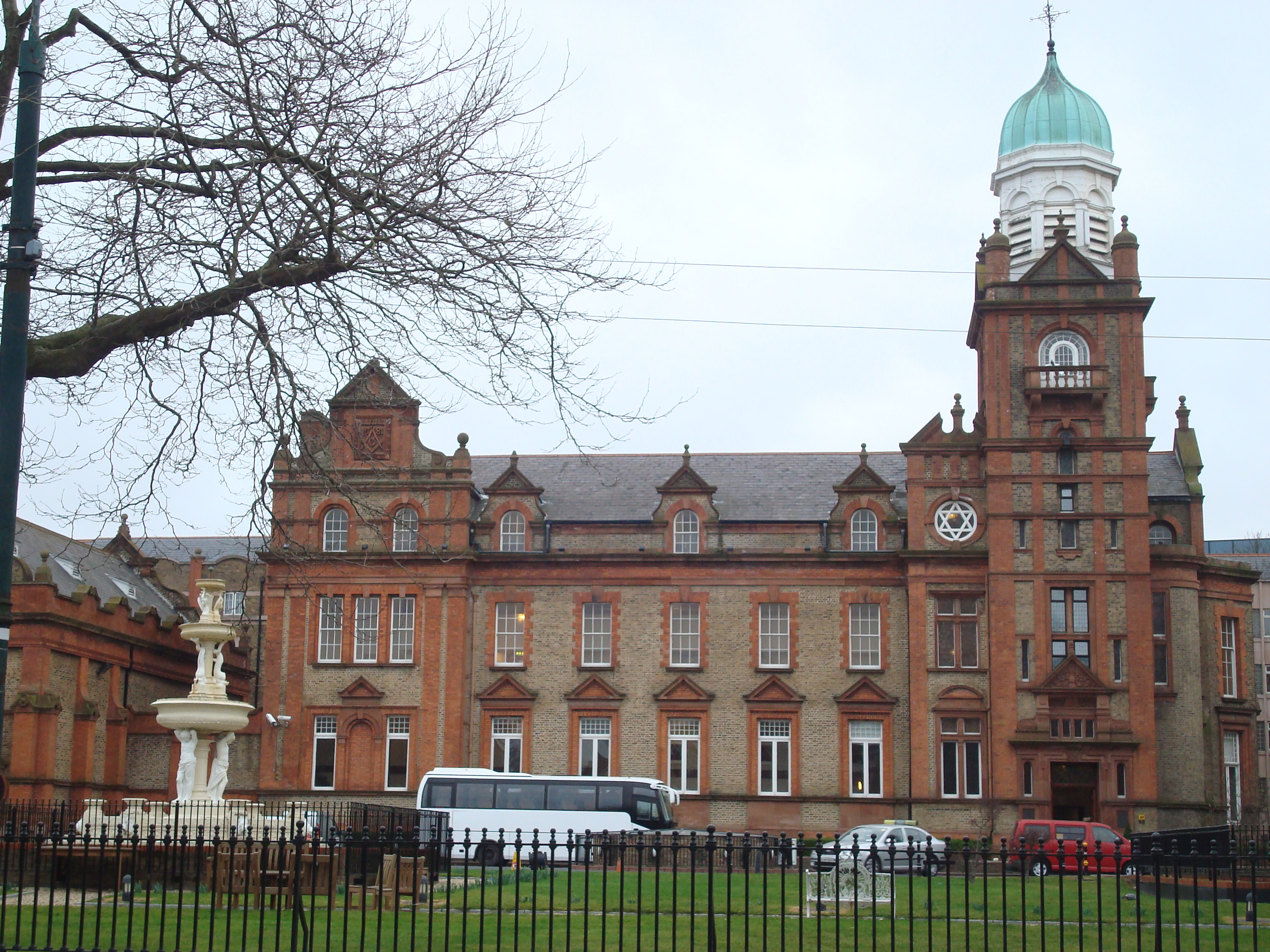

Location
- Ballsbridge, Dublin; Ireland
- Coordinates: 53°19′32″N 6°13′29″W

Information
- Type: Former orphanage school
- Established: 1792
- Closed: 1970
- Gender: Female
- Age: 10 to 15

The Masonic Female Orphan School of Ireland was a Masonic school in Dublin, Ireland. The school was instituted in 1792, with the aim of maintaining the daughters of indigent Freemasons, unable through death, illness, or incapacitation to support their families.

The school closed in 1970.

== History ==
In 1788 Bartholomew Ruspini and nine fellow Freemasons met in London to discuss plans for establishing a charitable institution for the daughters of Masons who had fallen on hard times or whose death had meant hardship for their families. In 1790 several Irish Brethren met together and made themselves responsible for the school fees for girls. In 1792, a small house, affording accommodation for twenty girls, was taken in Dublin where the pupils were boarded, clothed and educated until such a time as they could earn their own living.

The children had to be between the ages of six and ten and were to be retained until they reached the age of fifteen and had to be the daughters of freemasons. At the end of their school life, girls were either returned to their family or supporters (known as Friends) or apprenticed and supported until they could establish themselves.

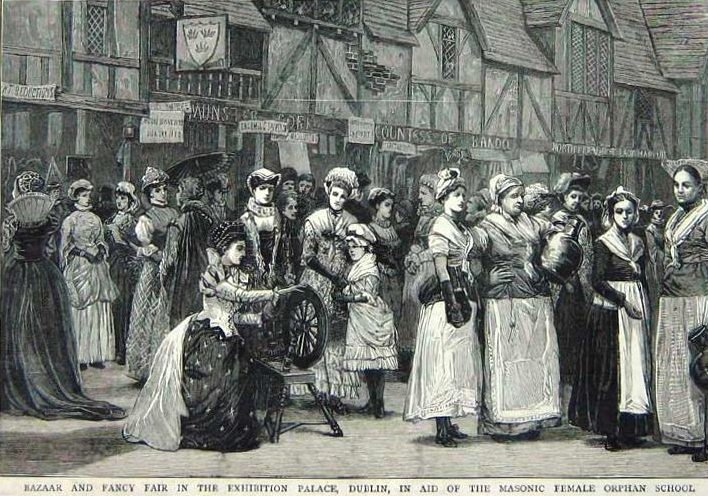
Masonic orphans school bazaar in Dublin, 1882

=== Burlington Place ===
In 1852, after several removals, a new building at Burlington Place overlooking the Grand Canal in Ballsbridge, was opened. The original architect was George Papworth. Extensive alterations were carried out by John McCurdy in 1861. The building has been demolished and the Mespil Hotel has been located on the site since 1996.

=== Merrion Road ===
An impressive newly built school was opened on Merrion Road in 1881.

Bazaars and fairs were held to provide funds for the school. On 16 May 1892 the Masonic Centenary five-day Bazaar opened at the Royal Dublin Society grounds, adjacent to the school. The opening was presided over by the Grand Master, the Duke of Abercorn. Among the highlights were reconstructions of historic Dublin buildings, a human chess game, and landscaped gardens. Some 96,000 passed through the turnstiles over the five days. A profit of over £21,690 was made from the 50 stalls and turnstile tickets.

The school closed permanently in 1970.

In the present day, the school building houses the Clayton Hotel.

== See also ==
- Masonic Boys School, Dublin
