= Chris Gruler =

American baseball player (born 1983)

- Pitcher
- Born: September 11, 1983 (age 42); Cedar Rapids, Iowa, U.S.
- Bats: Right Throws: Right

Chris Gruler (born September 11, 1983) is an American former baseball pitcher. He was drafted by the Cincinnati Reds in the first round of the 2002 MLB draft but never reached the major leagues because of injuries.
