= Shelbourne Hotel =

Hotel on St. Stephen's Green in Dublin, Ireland

- Óstán Shíol Bhroin
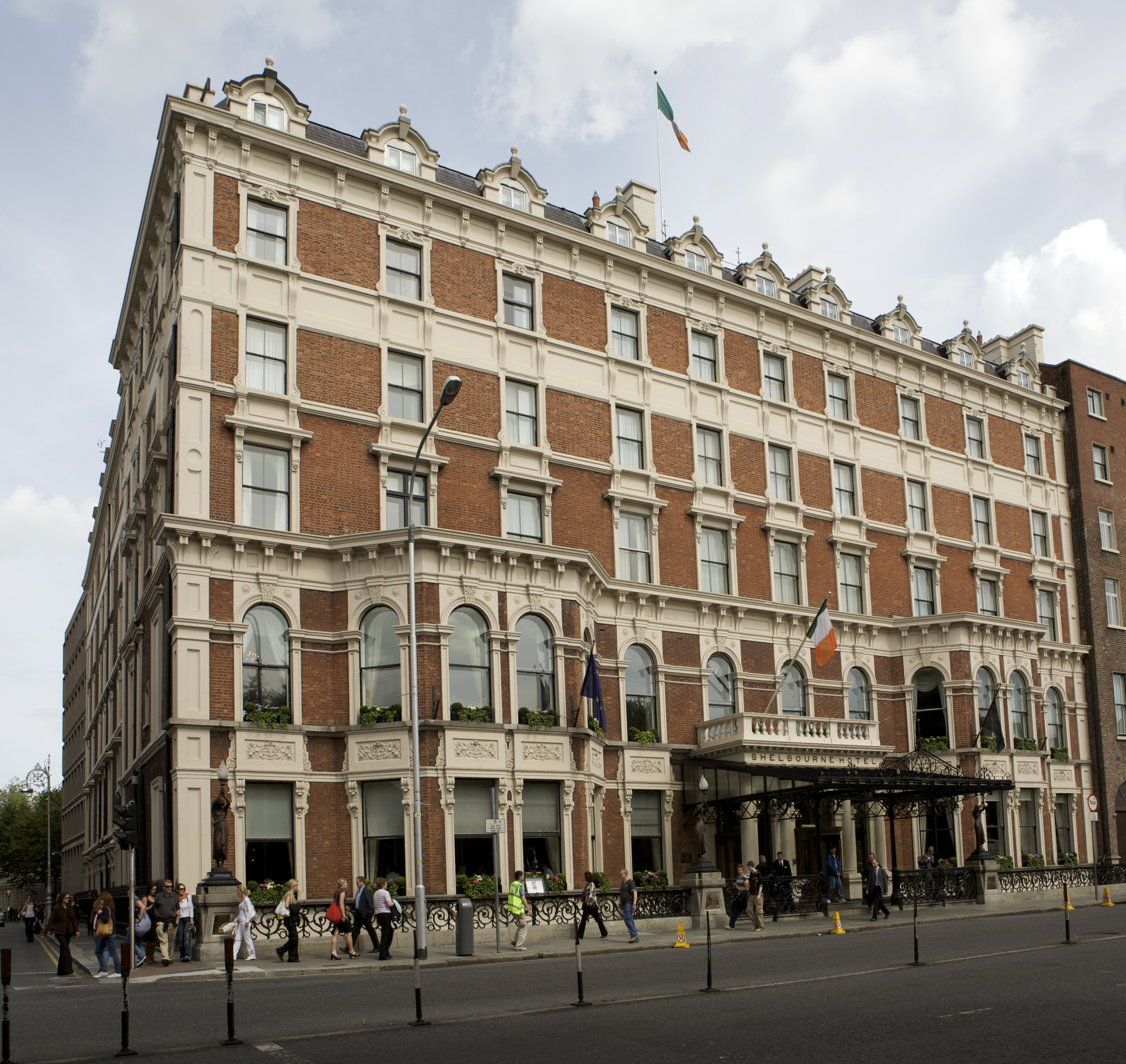
- The Shelbourne Hotel, August 2008

- Location within Central Dublin

General information
- Status: Open
- Type: Hotel
- Classification: 5 stars
- Location: 27 St Stephen's Green, Dublin 2, D02 K224, Dublin, Ireland
- Coordinates: 53.33893°N 6.256092°W
- Elevation: 18 m (59 ft)
- Named for: William Petty, 2nd Earl of Shelburne
- Opened: 1824
- Owner: Archer Hotel Capital

Technical details
- Floor count: 8

Design and construction
- Architect: John McCurdy

Other information
- Number of rooms: 265

Website
- theshelbourne.com

The Shelbourne Hotel is a historic hotel in Dublin, Ireland, situated in a landmark building on the north side of St Stephen's Green. It is owned by Archer Hotel Capital and operated by Marriott International under their Autograph Collection brand.

== History ==
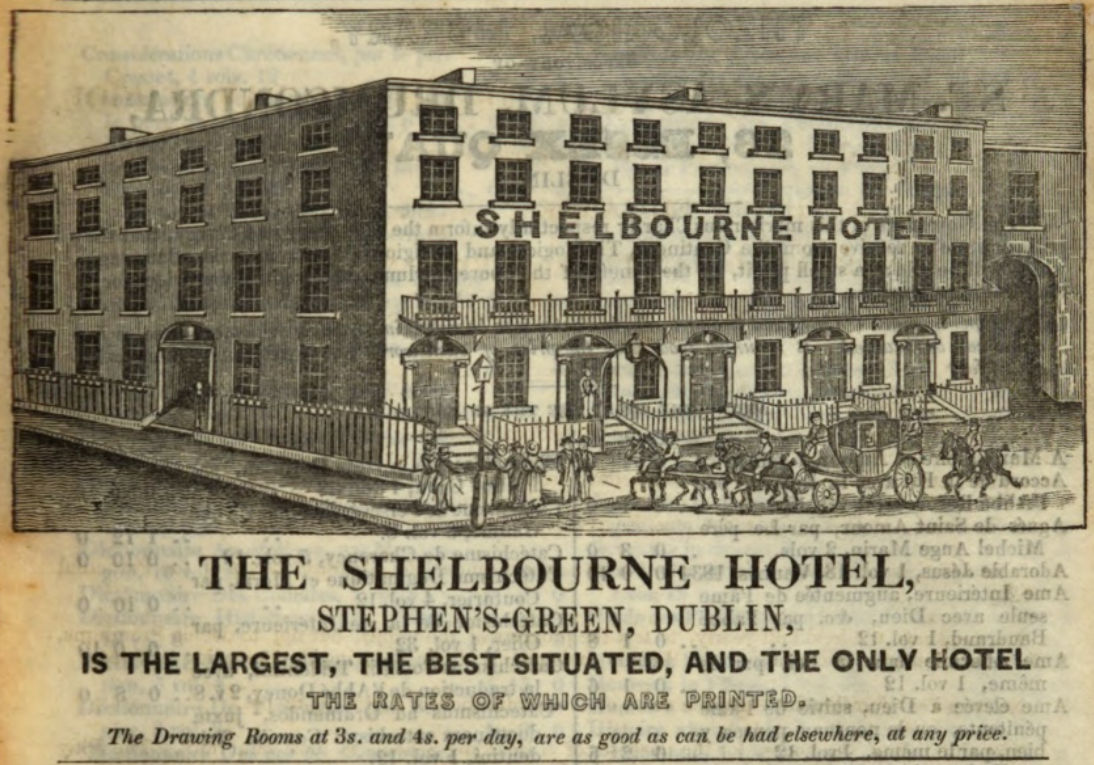
The hotel from an advertisement in the Dublin Almanac of 1844.

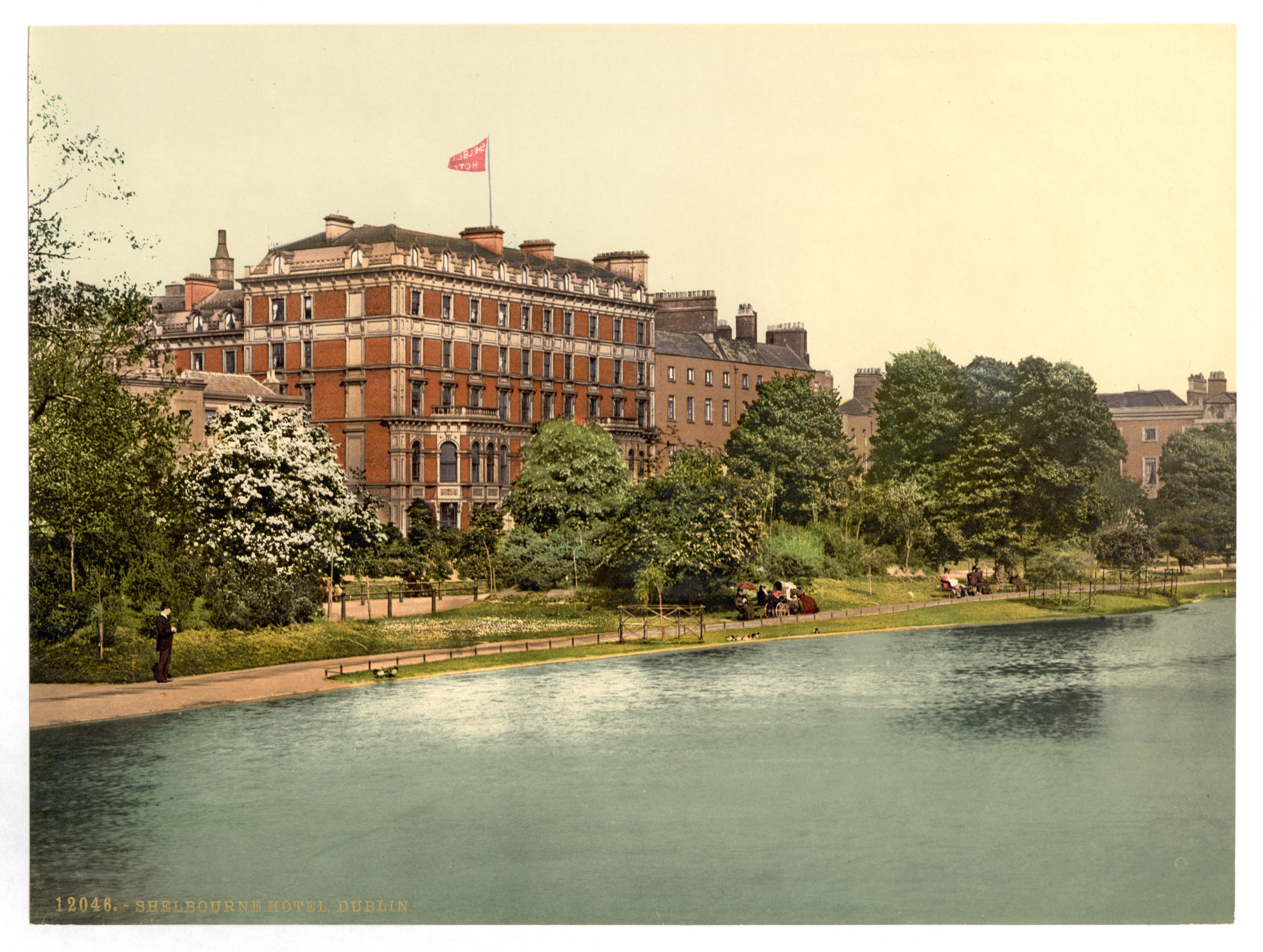
A photochrom print of Shelbourne Hotel, c. 1900

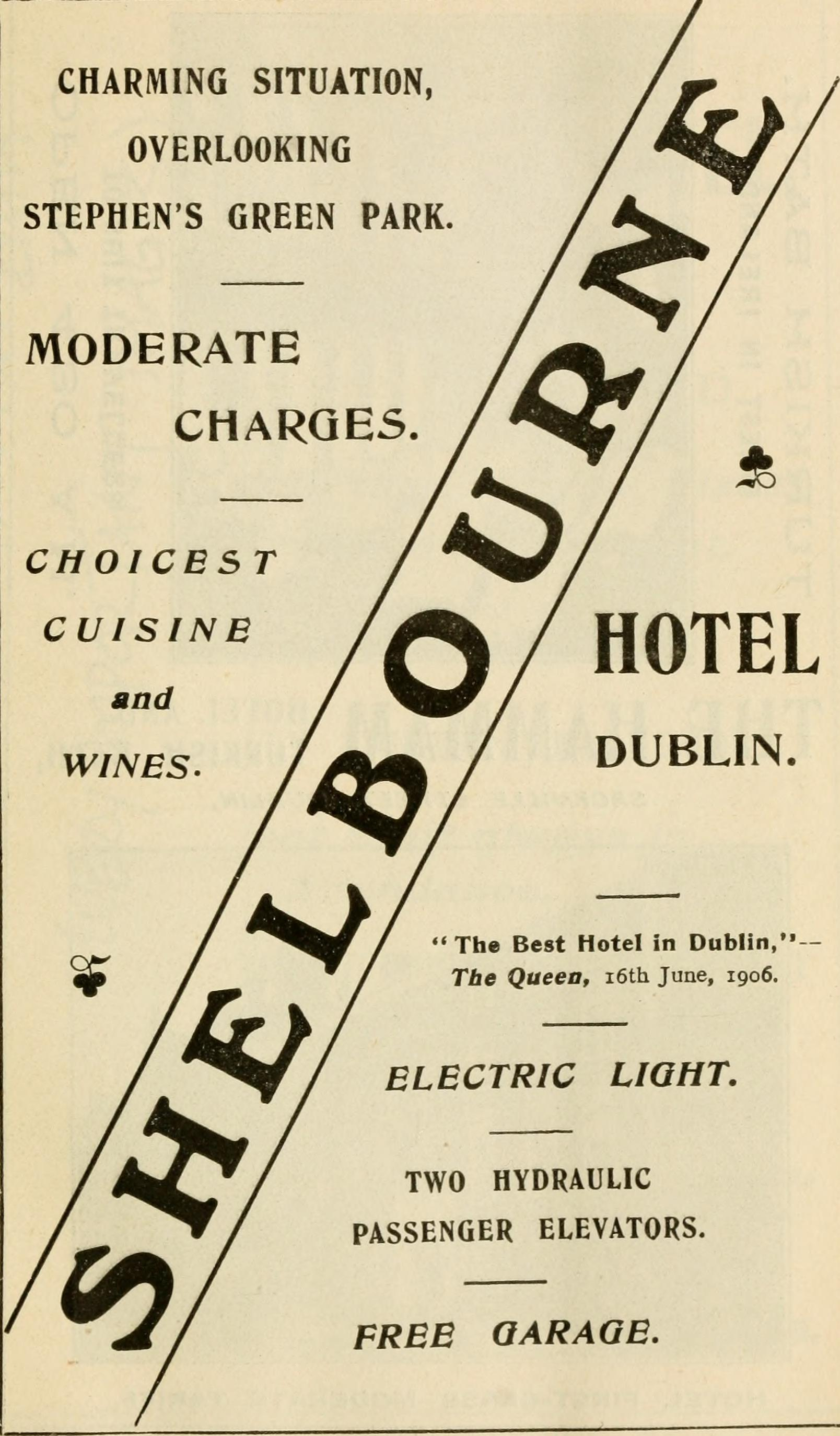
1919 advertisement for the Shelbourne, with praise from Queen Alexandra.

The Shelbourne Hotel was founded in 1824 by Martin Burke, a native of County Tipperary, when he acquired three adjoining townhouses overlooking Stephen's Green, Europe's largest garden square. Burke named his grand new hotel The Shelbourne, after William Petty, 2nd Earl of Shelburne. William Makepeace Thackeray was an early guest, staying in 1842 and including a piece about the Shelbourne in The Irish Sketch-Book (1843).

In July 1877, Dom Pedro II, Emperor of Brazil, stayed at the hotel as part of a largely unpublicised visit to Ireland.

In the early 1900s, Alois Hitler, Jr., the elder half-brother of Adolf Hitler, worked in the hotel while in Dublin.

In the late 19th century, the ability for a wealthy gentleman to be able to "handle the ribbons" of his own coach was popular for a time, according to a 1947 article in the Dublin Historical Record. Sir Thomas Talbot Power (1863–1930), one of the Power baronets, was a "devotee of this sport" and would drive "a coach-and-four from the Shelbourne Hotel, for public hire, to Bray and back". For a fee, one or more passengers would be driven to Bray, have dinner at the International Hotel ("at which Sir Thomas usually provided champagne"), and would be driven back to the Shelbourne afterwards.

During the 1916 Easter Rising the hotel was occupied by 40 British troops under Captain Andrews to counter the Irish Citizen Army and Irish Volunteer forces, commanded by Michael Mallin, who had occupied Stephen's Green. In 1922, the Constitution of the Irish Free State was drafted in room 112, now known as The Constitution Room.

In 1960, the Cotton Jury family, which had owned the hotel for nearly a century, sold it to Trust House Hotels, later known as the Forte Group. The Forte Group bought the Le Méridien hotel chain in 1994. In 1996, the hotel was renamed Le Meridien Shelbourne Hotel. That same year, Granada plc bought Forte. In 2000, Granada merged with Compass Group, the world's biggest contract catering company. The chains de-merged the following year, with the hotel operations remaining with Compass.

In 2001, Compass sold the Le Méridien chain, including the Shelbourne Hotel, for £1.9 billion to Japanese investment bank Nomura Securities. Later that year, Nomura sold the hotel for €115m to Royal Bank of Scotland. Le Méridien continued to operate the hotel until January 2004, when RBS negotiated a long-term lease with Marriott International to assume operation of the Shelbourne under their Renaissance Hotels brand, and the hotel was renamed The Shelbourne Dublin, A Renaissance Hotel.

In December 2004, Royal Bank of Scotland sold the hotel for €140 million to Kantaka Enterprises, a consortium of five Irish developers - Bernard McNamara, John Sweeney, Bernard Doyle, Jerry O’Reilly and David Courtney. They spent €125m on renovations, financed by Bank of Ireland and Anglo Irish Bank. In 2014, Beverly Hills-based Kennedy Wilson bought the hotel out of receivership from Bank of Ireland and the liquidators of Irish Bank Resolution Corporation (formerly Anglo Irish Bank), for $152 million.

The facade was refurbished in 2016, winning an award from the Irish Georgian Society. In December 2018 UEFA's executive committee made the draw for the 2019 UEFA Nations League Finals in the hotel.

In 2019, the hotel was transferred to Marriott's Autograph Collection brand and renamed The Shelbourne, Autograph Collection. In 2024, Kennedy Wilson sold the hotel to Dutch investment firm Archer Hotel Capital for just under €260 million. In late 2025, the hotel is scheduled to undergo a €50 million renovation. Marriott's management contract runs to 2026.

== Statues ==
A major redesign by John McCurdy was completed in 1867, with the Foundry of Val d'Osne casting the four external caryatid style torchère statues. These were based on two repeated beaux-arts neoclassical models originally sculpted by the prolific French sculptor Mathurin Moreau entitled Égyptienne – the two female Ancient Egyptian figures flanking either side of the front door, and Négresse – the two female ancient Kushite (Nubian) figures flanking either corner of the main building. All four statues are wearing gold coloured anklets, and are draped, with jewellery picked out in gilt while supporting a torch with a frosted glass flambeau shade. All four statues are on a circular base with a further square metal plinth with cartouches to the angles indicating royal descent.

In faint writing at the front of the circular base of all four statues can be seen the name of the foundry which produced the statues Val d'Osne. Of the several other examples of the castings, the most notable can be seen in the porch of the hôtel de ville (town hall) in the French town of Remiremont as well as outside the mausoleum of the architect Temple Hoyne Buell in Denver, Colorado and in the Jardins do Palácio de Cristal in Porto. In all three cases the door is flanked either side by one Égyptienne and one Négresse statue indicating parity.

In July 2020, the statues at the front of the building were removed by management as a precautionary response to the toppling and removal of statues following the murder of George Floyd and Black Lives Matter protests. This move resulted from the belief that either two or all four of the statues represented Nubian slaves shown in manacles. Both histories of the hotel, that of 1951 by Elizabeth Bowen and that of 1999 by Michael O'Sullivan, state that two of the statues represent slaves or servants, with Bowen stating "on each stands a female statue, Nubian in aspect, holding a torch shaped lamp". Kyle Leyden, lecturer in Early Modern Architecture and Visual Culture at the Courtauld Institute, pointed out that the statues were mass-produced decorative arts items chosen by the builder of the hotel from a trade catalogue which did not identify them as representing slaves, instead referring to them as women of Egypt and Sub-Saharan Africa. He argued that none of the statues are of the established "Nubian slave" type – at least two of them wear headdress indicating royal status – and that all four figures wear anklets indicating aristocratic status, rather than shackles. After an examination by Paula Murphy, an art historian at University College Dublin, concluded that the statues were not representations of slaves, it was announced that they would be restored to their plinths. After being cleaned, they were reinstalled on the night of 14 December.

== Literary references ==
In James Joyce's Ulysses, Leopold Bloom remembers the Shelbourne as where "Mrs Miriam Dandrade", a "Divorced Spanish American" sold him "her old wraps and black underclothes".

The Shelbourne appears In the historical mystery novel Elegy for April, written by the Booker Prize-winning Irish author John Banville, published under his pen name Benjamin Black.

== See also ==
- Shelbourne Road
