= Bartholomew Ruspini =

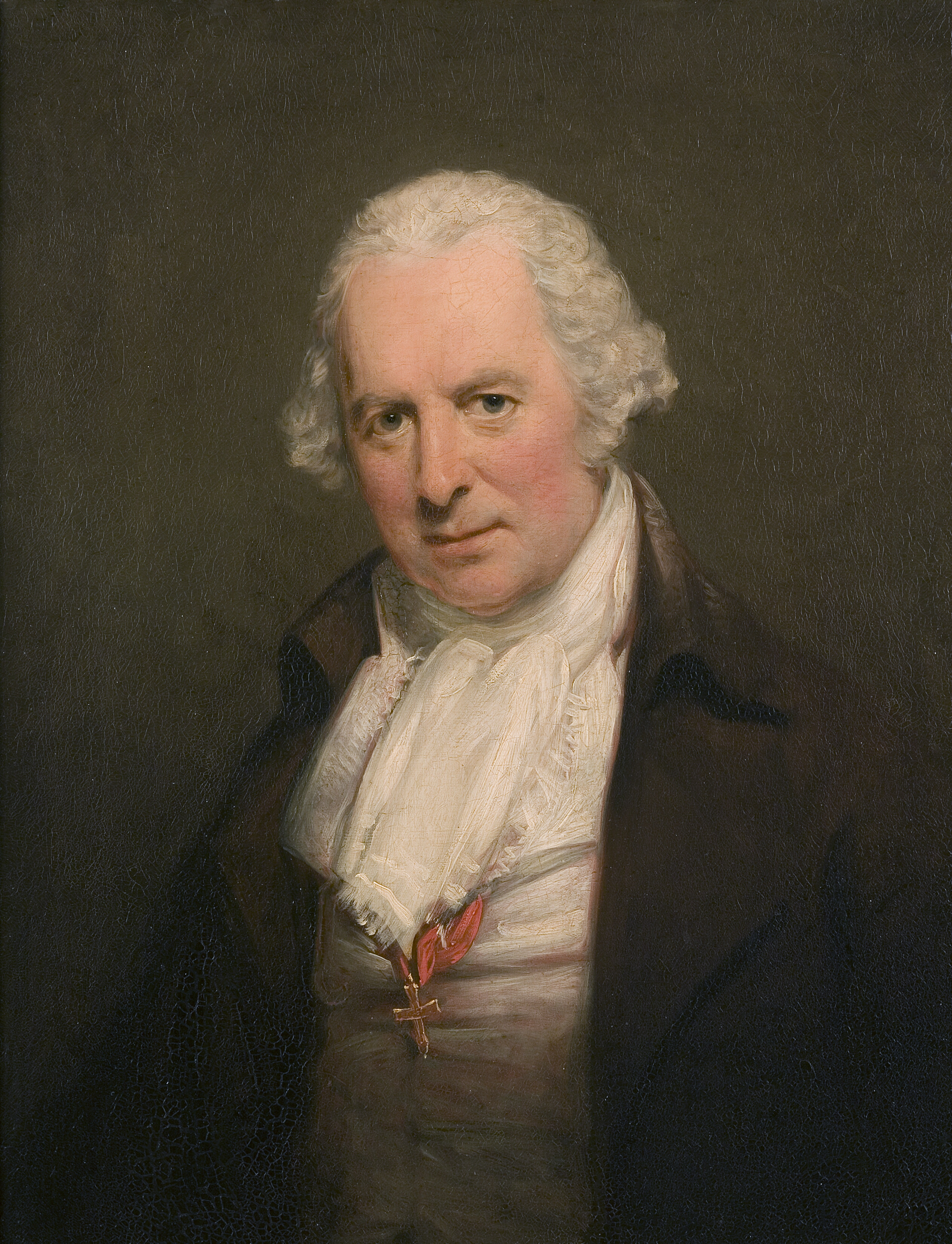
Portrait of Ruspini by George Romney, National Gallery of Denmark.

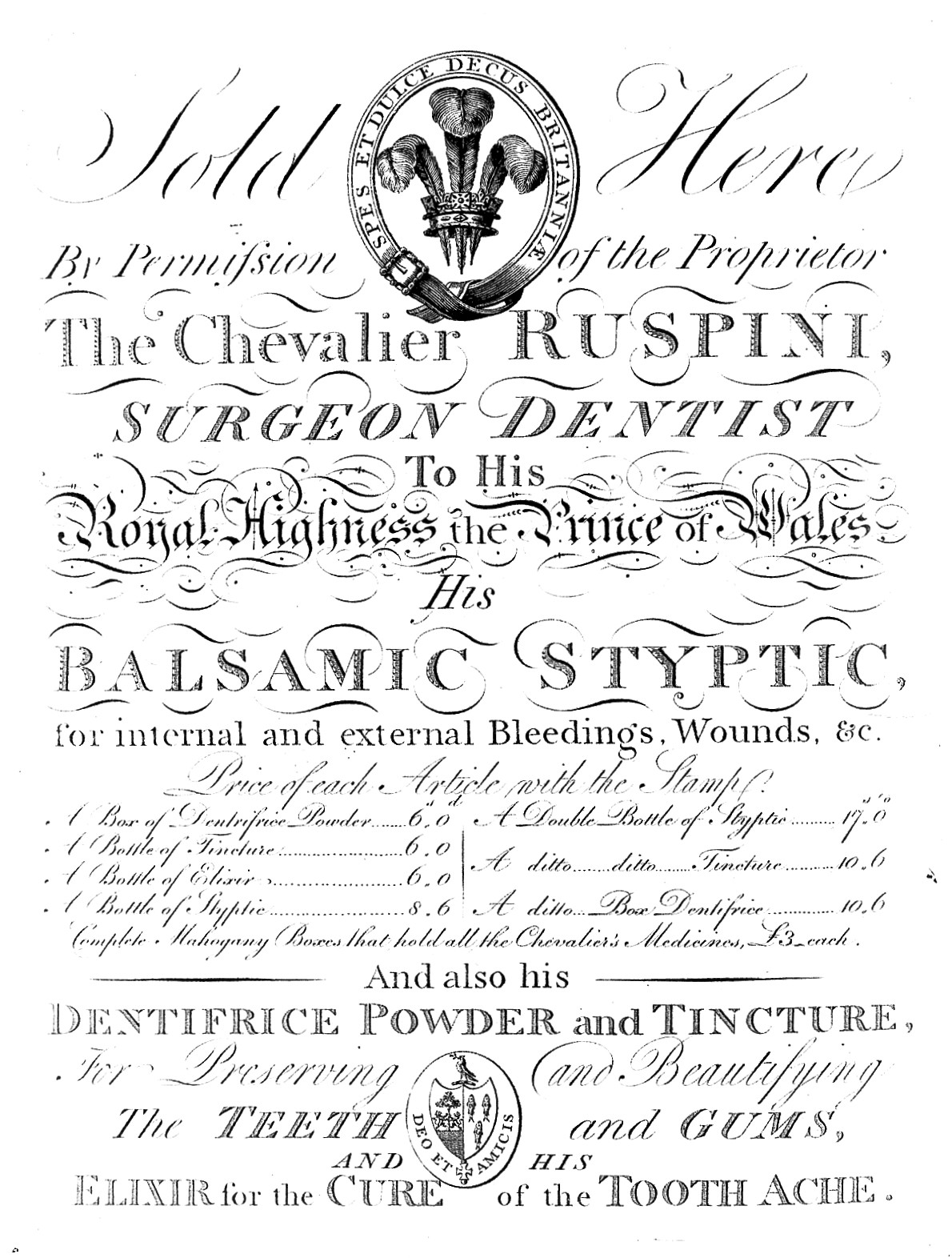
Advert for Ruspini's balsamic styptic.

Bartolomeo Ruspini (25 March/6 April 1728 – 14 December 1813), also known as Bartholomew Ruspini, was an Italian-born British surgeon-dentist and philanthropist in the 18th century, remembered for founding the Royal Masonic School for Girls.

== Early biography ==
The chevalier Bartholomew Ruspini was born in 1728, in Zogno, Republic of Venice, about 40 miles north-east of Milan. He was the son of Andreas Ruspini of Grumello, a minor member of a patrician family which originated from Croglio, in the ancient Italian region of Como (in the present-day Canton of Ticino in Switzerland). He was recognised as a surgeon on 18 June 1758 by the college of physical sciences in Bergamo. On 18 July 1758 he received a certificate licensing him to practise in all areas of surgery. It seems possible that he completed his training at an earlier date and, having decided to specialise in dentistry, he then went to Paris, the accepted centre for training in this field. Dentistry in 18th-century Europe was not perceived as a skilled profession, nor had it the status it has now — dentistry of this period acquired a reputation as a sideline of blacksmiths, hairdressers and (frequently) charlatans. Ruspini styled himself as a "surgeon dentist" to separate himself from the like of these.

== Move to England ==
Although there is no certainty of his movements it seems possible that Ruspini moved on from his training in Paris to England, taking with him introductions from French and Italian noblemen. It is unclear exactly when he first came to England but an advertisement in the York Courant on 19 May 1752 identifies him as an Italian surgeon offering a remedy for scurvy of the mouth and gums. So confident was he of his technique that he made the first consultation free of charge and no payment was required until the patient had been cured.

Quite when Ruspini came to England is further confused by the reference in the 1752 advertisement in which he claimed to have already cured several people in Manchester. Four years later there is a reference to a marriage to Elizabeth Stiles on 19 February 1757

== Ruspini and the Masons ==
In November 1759 he was put forward as a candidate for initiation into a Masonic lodge, the Bear lodge, but was rejected. On his second application for membership in 1762 he was accepted into the Burning Bush Lodge in Bristol. In 1766 he was also practising in London under the patronage of the mother of George III. That he was established in society is perhaps confirmed by his second marriage to Elizabeth Orde on 6 April 1767. Ruspini had recently renounced Roman Catholicism and become an Anglican. No mention is made of Ruspini's Italian ancestry in the marriage announcement whereas the Orde family and their connections with nobility and prominent citizens is expanded upon.

In 1768 Ruspini became the author of a Treatise on Teeth. He wrote about many things that we now take for granted including the effect of too much sugar on the teeth, but he also wrote that sleeping with the head uncovered would result in dental disease. Also in 1768 Ruspini's first child was born. James Balden Ruspini who was soon followed by George Bartholomew Ruspini who both went on to become surgeon dentists. In all Ruspini had 9 children, four sons and five daughters.

By 1777 Ruspini was established enough within society and within the Masonic movement to be a founder member of a Lodge, the Lodge of the Nine Muses. This gained many Italian members which would indicate that Ruspini was keen and able to help compatriots who had migrated from Italy. In April 1789, the "Honourable Order of Knighthood and Dignity of Count of the Sacred Palace of the Lateran" was conferred upon him by Francis, Duke of Sforza-Cesarini, bringing with it the title of Chevalier.

== Philanthropy ==
Ruspini was anxious to ensure that the poorer people in London should not be disadvantaged and arranged that his tooth powder should be available free from a doctor's house in Fore Street. His willingness to help others who had suffered misfortune is noted further by his help to Mrs Cornelys, who was suffering financially and his desire to help the children of masons who had died or were unable to support their families. He did this by setting up the Royal Masonic School for Girls to provide education to the daughters of masons.

He died at his home in Pall Mall, aged 85, and was buried in the churchyard of St. James's Church, Piccadilly on 19 December 1813. His grave was destroyed by enemy bombs during the Second World War. A memorial to him lies within the church. He did not leave a great fortune, even for his time. He left his wife an annuity of £150 plus enough furniture for a bedroom and sitting room wherever she chose to live, as well as money for his sons. Today his statue stands at the Royal Masonic School where he is remembered and where his birthday, 25 March, is celebrated as "Ruspini Day".

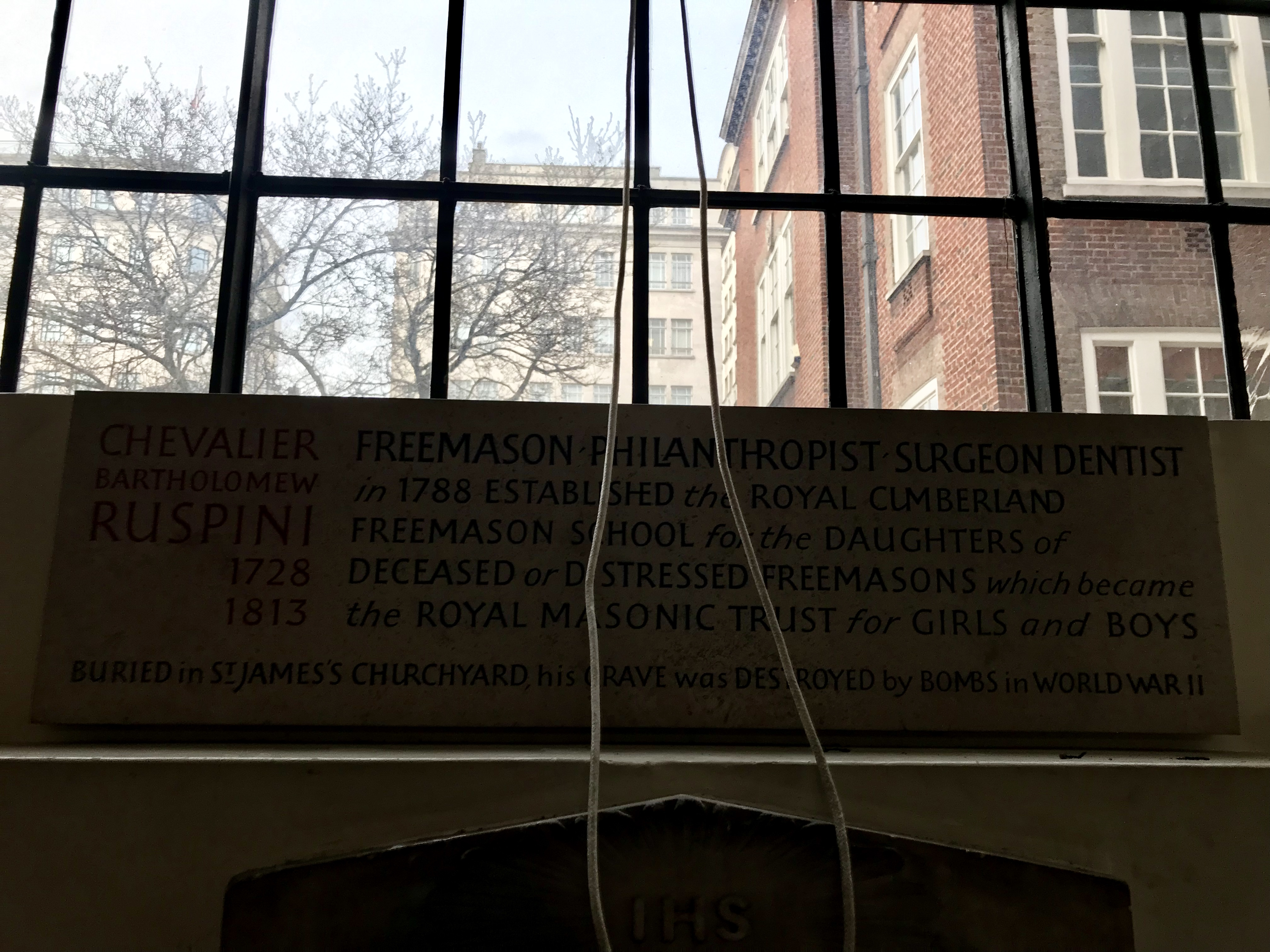
A memorial to Bartholomew Ruspini in St James's Church, Piccadilly.

== See also ==
- (in Italian) Ruspini family

== Bibliography ==
- Bartolmew Ruspini. A Treatise on the Teeth, Their Structure and Various Diseases. Londra, 1768
- Giovanni Ruspini. Manuale eclettico di Rimedj nuovi. Bergamo, 1871, In-8°, pp. VIII-786.
- Vanni Zanella (a cura di). Giacomo Quarenghi architetto a Pietroburgo. Lettere e altri scritti. Venezia, Albrizzi, 1988, pp. 39–40
- Piervaleriano Angelini. Spigolature quarenghiane in Bergomum. 1995, n. 3, pp. 43–68
- Bortolo Belotti,. Vita intellettuale letteraria e artistica bergamasca nel primo ottocenti: gli scienziati, Giovanni Ruspini in Storia di Bergamo e dei bergamaschi, Volume 7. Libro undicesimo, Bergamo, 1989, 7: 295 p., ill., 33 cm.
- Schiavini Trezzi, Juanita. Dal collegio dei notai all'Archivio notarile. Fonti per la storia del notariato a Bergamo (secoli XIV-XIX). Inventario dell'archivio. Collegii Notariorum Bergomi institutio et ordines... 1636, Trascrizione Bergamo: Provincia di Bergamo, Settore Istruzione, 1997, 362 p., [10] c. di tav., fot., 24 cm (Fonti per lo studio del territorio bergamasco; 15), ISBN 88-86536-01-1.
- Giulio Conci. Giovanni Ruspini 1808–1885. Roma, Sacra Famiglia 1929. Bross., -in 8° pp. 12. Estratto.
- G. Locatelli. Per il centenario di Giovanni Ruspini. Carte e manoscritti ordinati in Bergomum, 1 (1907), 2, parte speciale, p. 11–23, con l'elenco dei corrispondenti.
- Giuseppe Tassini. Curiosità veneziane, ovvero Origini delle denominazioni stradali di Venezia 7^{a} ed. Venezia, 1970
- Christoph Frank. Appendice documentaria sul viaggio in Russia di Giacomo Quarenghi e Giacomo Trombara nell'anno 1779, a cura di Christoph Frank, in Dal mito al progetto., vol. I, pp. 79–91.
- Lorna Cowburn. Polished Cornerstones, A history of the Royal Masonic School for Girls 1788–2000. Raithby, Lawrence & Company Ltd.
- Barbara Kelland. This Time Next Week: the engaging story of a little girl, brought up in the care of the Freemasons, before and during World War II. Epona Publishing, 21 luglio 2005.
- Paul Geissler. John Menzies Campbell, a Glasgow dentist, an Edinburgh legacy, in Surgeons' news, vol 2 – issue 2, aprile 2003.
- F. Lechi. Le dimore bresciane, Vol. 7°, pp. 305–306.
- Ida Zanolini. La Storia di Castenedolo
- P. J. Dawson, La Loggia inglese delle Nove Muse, in "Rivista Massonica", 1973
