= John McCurdy (baseball) =

American baseball player

- Catcher / Outfielder / Third Baseman
- Born: April 17, 1981; Pittsburgh, Pennsylvania
- Bats: Right Throws: Right

John McCurdy is a professional baseball player who was drafted by the Oakland Athletics in the 1st round (26th) of the 2002 Major League Baseball draft out of the University of Maryland, College Park after he was a member of Beane's List.

John also holds the World Record in the 1981 Arcade Game Donkey Kong, with 1,272,700 points
