= John McCurdy (architect) =

Irish architect (1824 – 1885)

- Born: 1824; Dublin, Ireland
- Died: 12 September 1885 (aged 60–61); Dalkey, Dublin
- Occupation: architect

John McCurdy (1824 – 12 September 1885) was an Irish architect.

== Life and family ==
John McCurdy was likely the younger son of William McCurdy, and was living with his father and older brother on Denzille Street in 1844. He married Lucy Heinekey (1836-1928) in 1857. They had a daughter, Agatha Mary (1858-1927), who was married Adam S. Findlater.

McCurdy died at his home, Elsinore, Dalkey, on 12 September 1885, and is buried in Deansgrange cemetery.

== Career ==
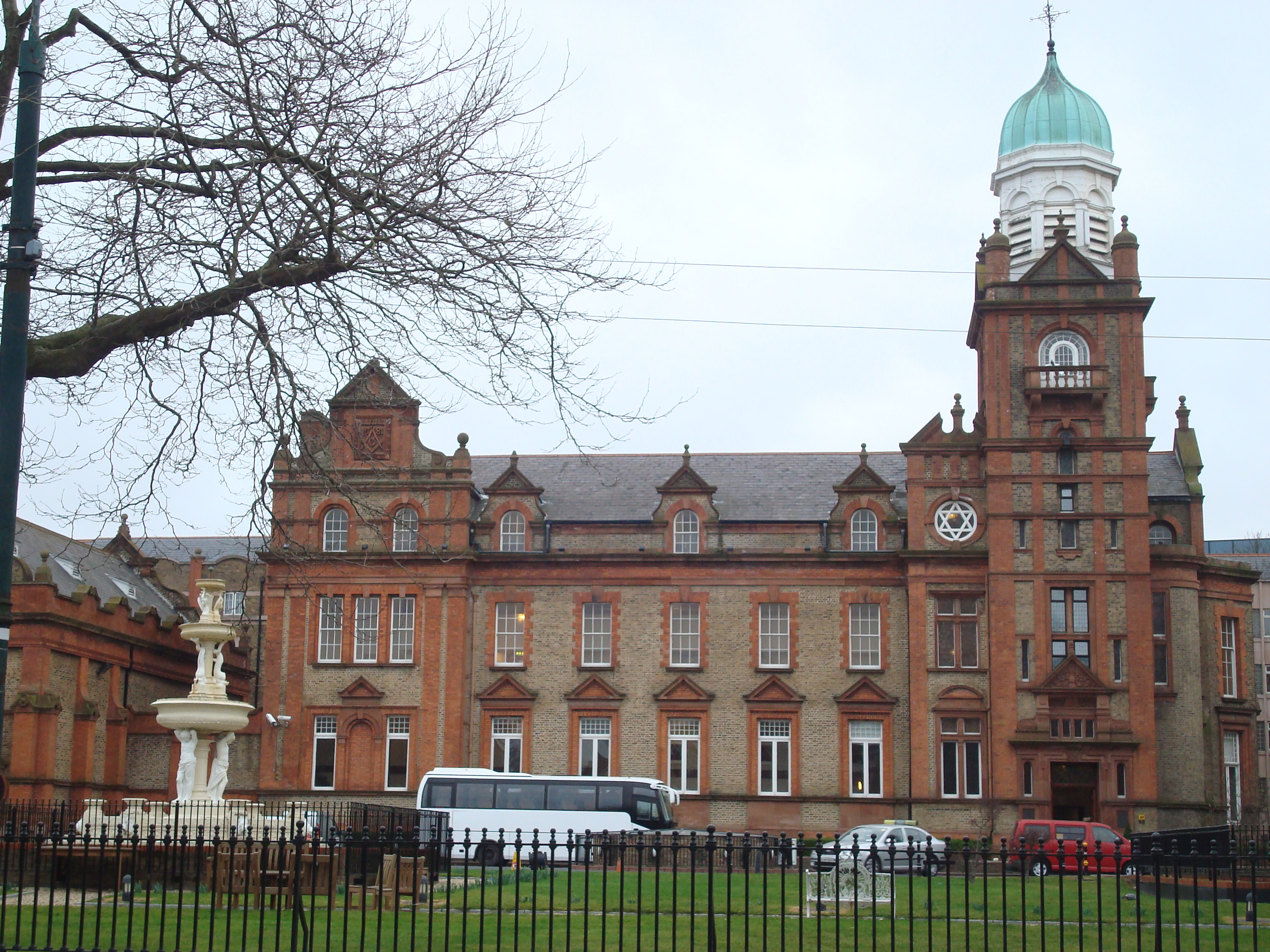
Masonic Female Orphan School of Ireland in Ballsbridge, Dublin (now a hotel)

He received his professional training in the office of Frederick Darley, architect to Trinity College, Dublin. He succeeded Benjamin Holebrook as clerk of works at Trinity College in 1850. Shortly afterwards he became the official college architect, a post which he retained until his death.

In 1872 he formed an architectural partnership with William Mansfield Mitchell, practising from Leinster Street. The partnership was dissolved in 1882.

He was a member of the Royal Institute of British Architects and was president for the last ten years of his life of the Royal Institute of the Architects of Ireland. From 1864 to 1875 he was a Blackrock Township Commissioner. From 1873 to 1883, he was architect to the Commissioners for Education of Certain Endowed Schools and to the Benchers of King's Inns.

He was a member of the Grand Lodge of Ireland (Freemasons) and designed the Masonic Female Orphan School of Ireland (now a hotel) which opened in 1882 as well as the Shelbourne Hotel.

== Bibliography ==
- M. Daly, M. Hearn & P. Pearson, Dublin's Victorian Houses (1998), pp. 160–161.
