= Giuseppe Tassini =

Italian historian

Giuseppe Tassini (12 November 1827 - 22 December 1899) was an Italian historian and one of the most notable scholars of the toponymy of his birthplace of Venice. His most notable work was Curiosità Veneziane, a minute toponymical study first published in 1863 and universally considered the most important bibliographical source of its kind.

== Life ==
Born into an old middle-class Venetian family, he was the son of Carlo (1781-1848), an official with the Austro-Hungarian Navy and his noble-born wife Elisabetta de Wasserfall. He had a bumpy childhood which only settled down after his father's death, gaining a laurea in law in 1860. He then mainly focussed on administering his family estates, including lands in Scorzè and several houses in Venice, and on further study.

He died of an apoplectic fit in his house near the sotoportego delle Cariole in Venice, not far from San Zulian. His body was discovered by a chamberlain of the Caffè dei Segretari who usually brought Tassini breakfast each morning - on 22 December 1899 he had not already opened his door and the chamberlain called a blacksmith to force it open. He was buried in a common grave and the location of his remains is now unknown. His manuscript books, houses and lands passed to a cousin who had emigrated to America, who then sold them off, with most of Tassini's notes bought by the Correr Museum.

== Works (in date order) ==
- La barba
- Gli occhiali
- Curiosità Veneziane - Ovvero: Origini delle denominazioni stradali di Venezia
- Il libertinaggio a Venezia
- Veronica Franco celebre letterata e cortigiana veneziana
- Feste, spettacoli, divertimenti e piaceri degli antichi veneziani
- Alcuni palazzi ed antichi edifizii di Venezia storicamente illustrati
- Edifici di Venezia distrutti o volti ad altro uso diverso da quello a cui furono in origine destinati
- Osservazioni critiche sopra le innovazioni praticate nella nomenclatura stradale di Venezia
- Alcune delle più clamorose condanne capitali eseguite in Venezia sotto la Repubblica
- Il veridico - Diario storico veneziano
- Le iscrizioni nella chiesa e convento di San Salvatore in Venezia
- Aneddoti storici veneziani
- Notizie storiche e genealogiche sui cittadini veneziani (unfinished)

Some of his works are in a Miscellanea published by Editrice Filippi.
