= William Acton (painter) =

English painter

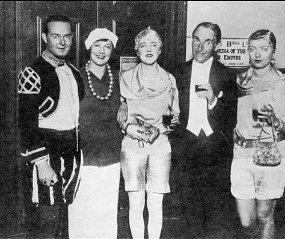
William Acton, Margot Bendir, Elizabeth Ponsonby, Harry Melville, Babe Plunket Greene at David Tennant's party 1928

William Hamilton Mitchell Acton (16 August 1906 – 31 August 1945) was an Anglo-Italian painter.

== Biography ==
William Hamilton Mitchell Acton was born on 16 August 1906, the son of Arthur Acton (1873–1953), an art collector and dealer, and Hortense Lenore Mitchell (1871–1962), the heiress of John J. Mitchell, President of the Illinois Trust and Savings Bank. Harold Acton was his older brother.

He attended Chateau de Lancy, Geneva, and Eton College; at Eton his contemporaries were Robert Byron, Brian Howard, Alfred Duggan and Anthony Powell, who remembered William fondly in his memoirs.

In 1922, a reproduction of his painting Nature Morte appeared in the Eton Candle. At Eton he was among the founders of the Eton Society of Arts in February 1922 with Brian Howard, Henry Yorke, his brother Harold, Alan Clutton-Brock, Hugh Lygon and Anthony Powell.

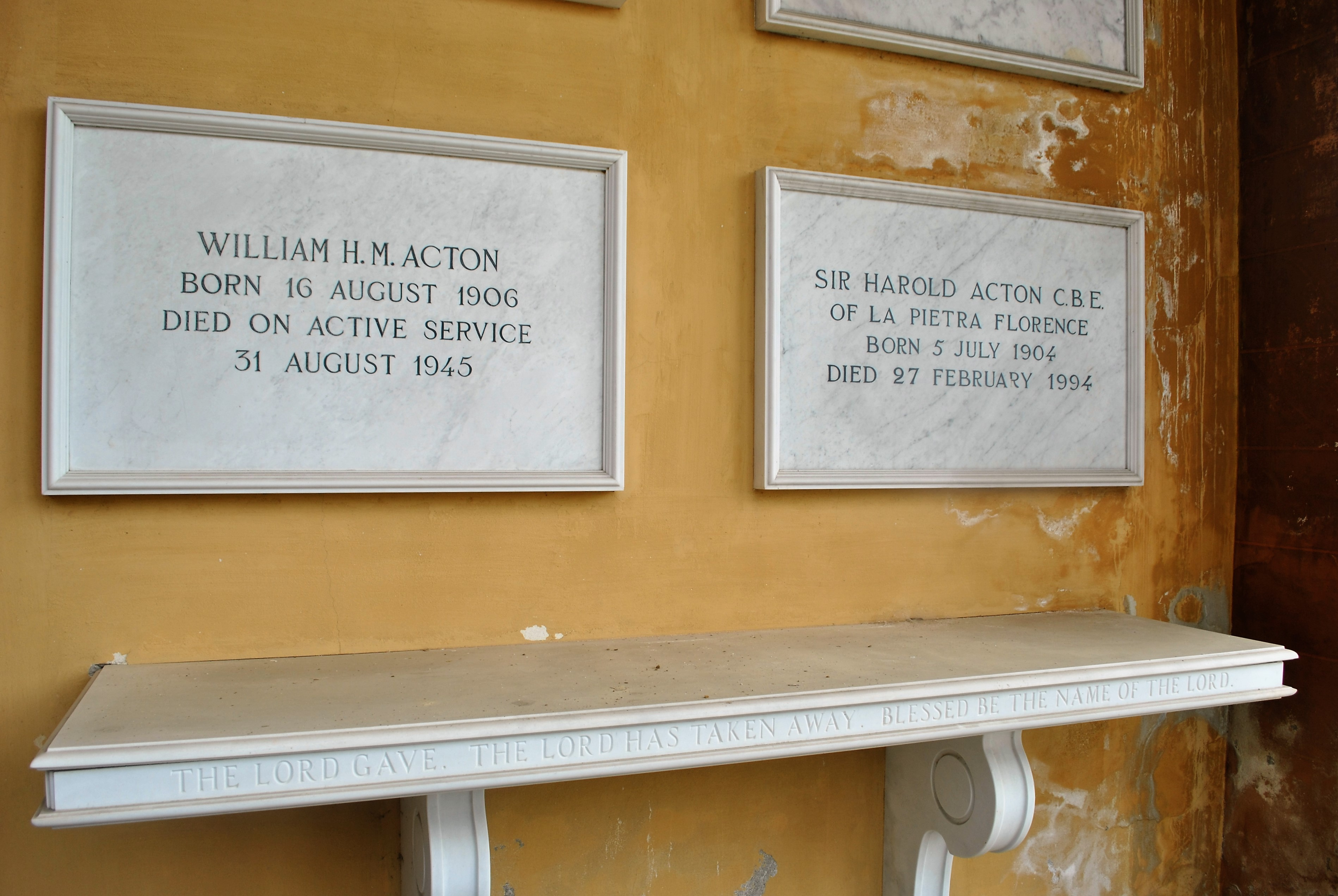
Cimitero Evangelico agli Allori

In 1925, Acton moved to Christ Church, Oxford, with many of his friends, but remained for only one year. Brian Howard wrote a satirical profile of William Acton in his Continuation of Oxford Portraits of 1925-6 which appeared in the Cherwell.

After college the Acton brothers were part of a circle including Diana Mitford and her first husband, Bryan Guinness, 2nd Baron Moyne, John Betjeman, Evelyn Waugh, Randolph Churchill and Diana Churchill. William Acton sketched the Mitford sisters.

Not long after being demobilised from service in the Pioneer Corps during World War II, William Acton died at a military hospital in Italy on 31 August 1945 aged 39 after a short illness and is buried with his family at Cimitero degli Allori.

Several works by William Acton have been sold at auctions, including "Armiola" sold at Christie's in 2016 for £16,250 (£22,300 in 2025 sterling).

== Gallery ==
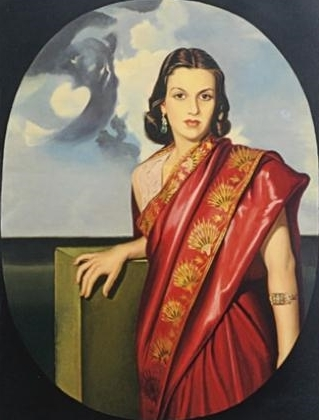
Bachoo Dinshaw, granddaughter of Seth Edulji Dinshaw

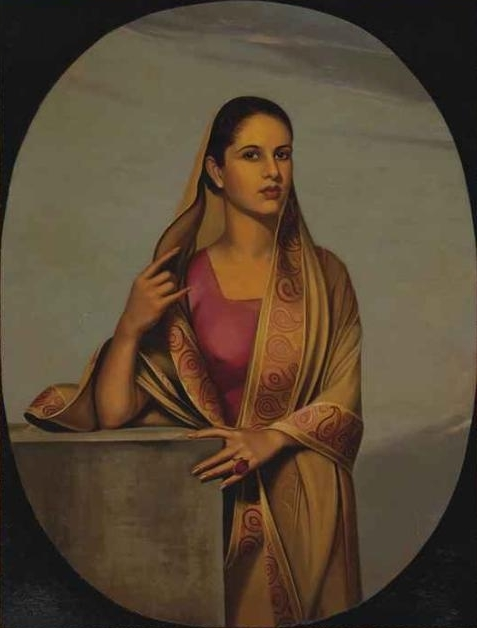
Markie Dinshaw, granddaughter of Seth Edulji Dinshaw

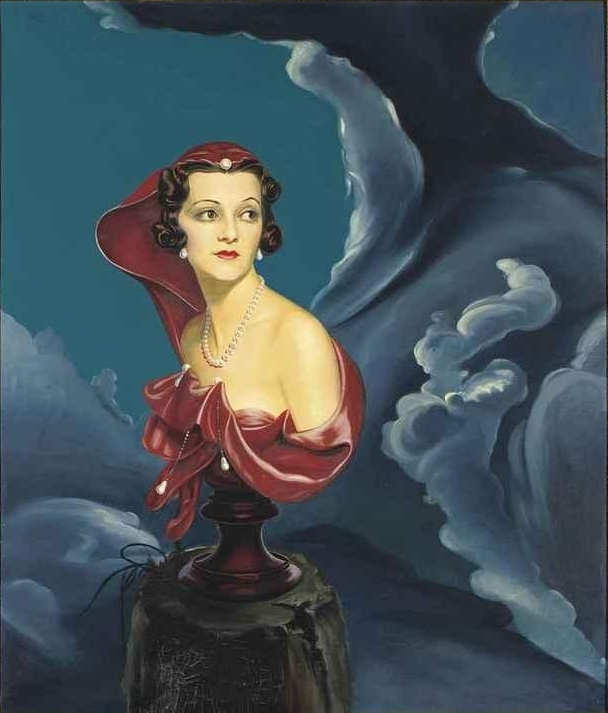
Georgia Doble, wife of Sacheverell Sitwell

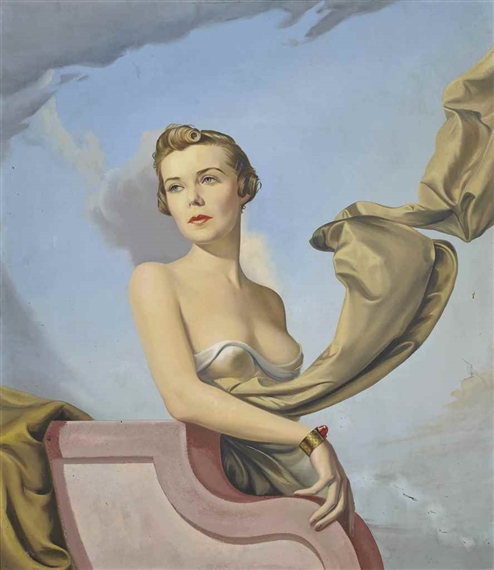
Armiola

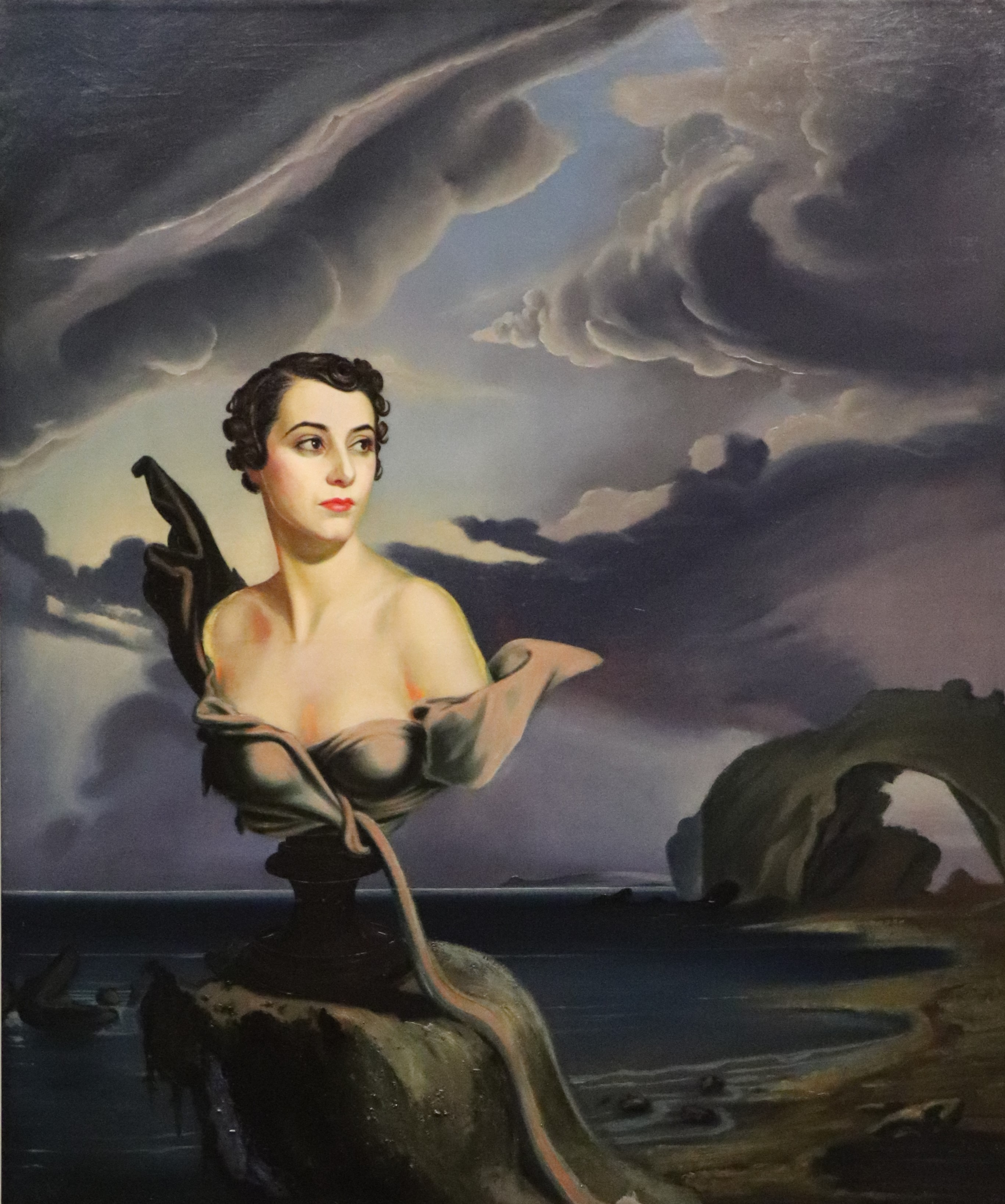
Loelia Ponsonby

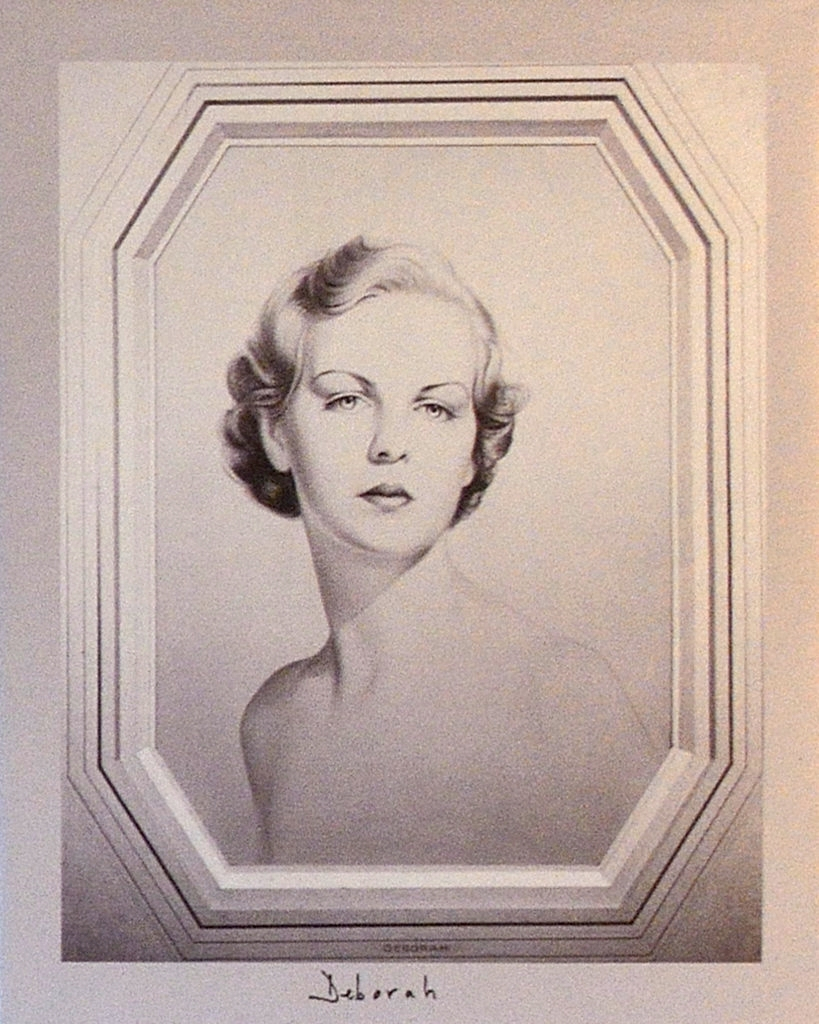
Deborah Mitford

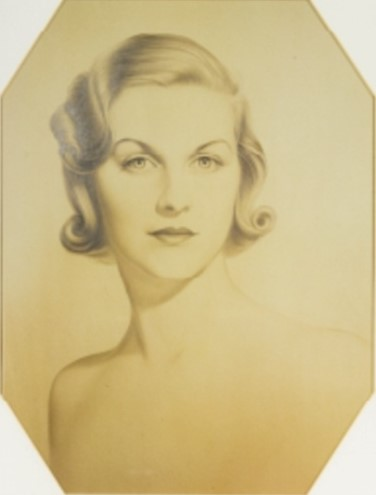
Diana Mitford

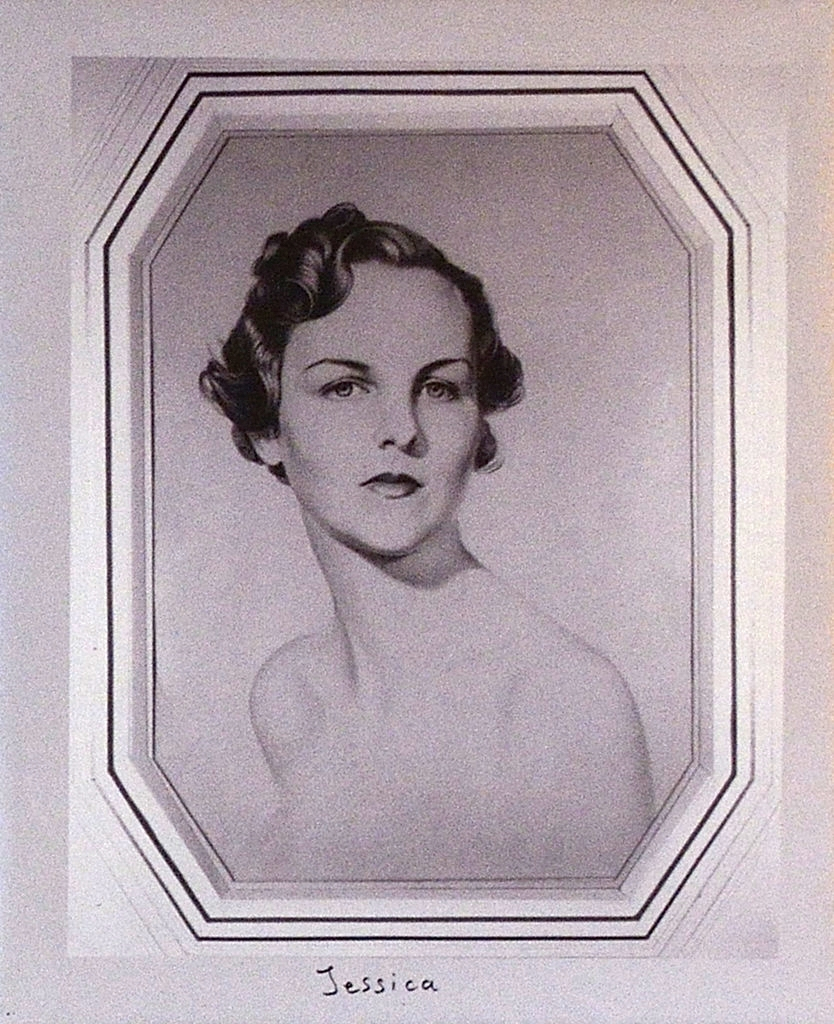
Jessica Mitford

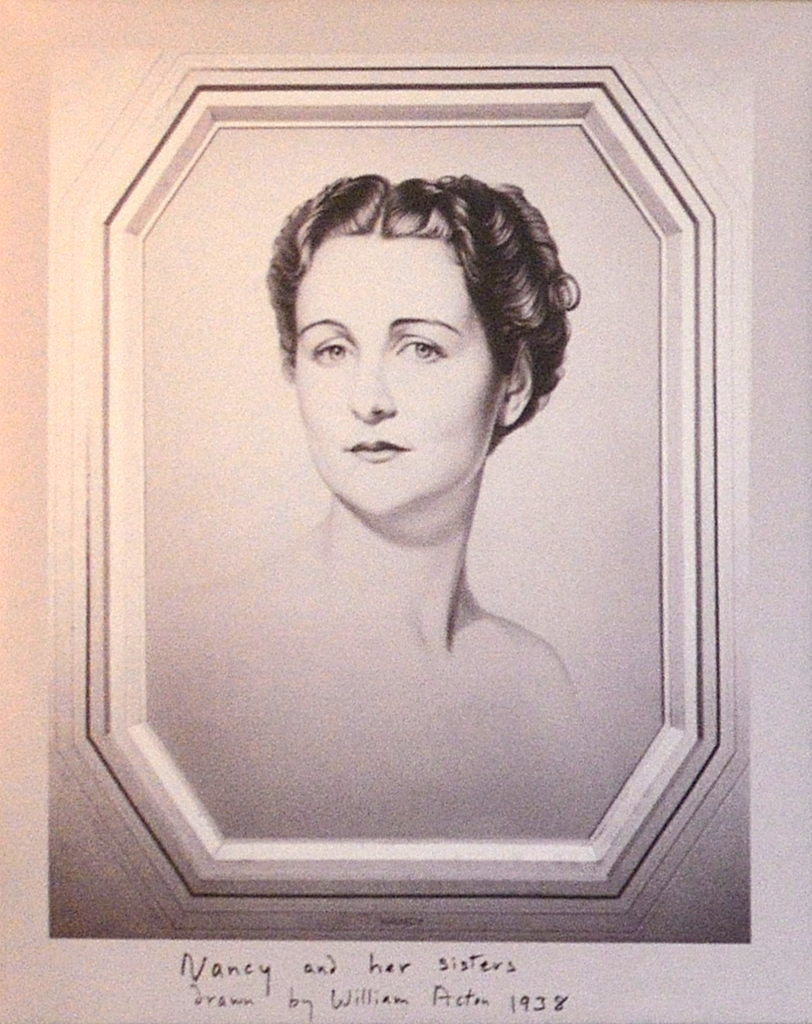
Nancy Mitford

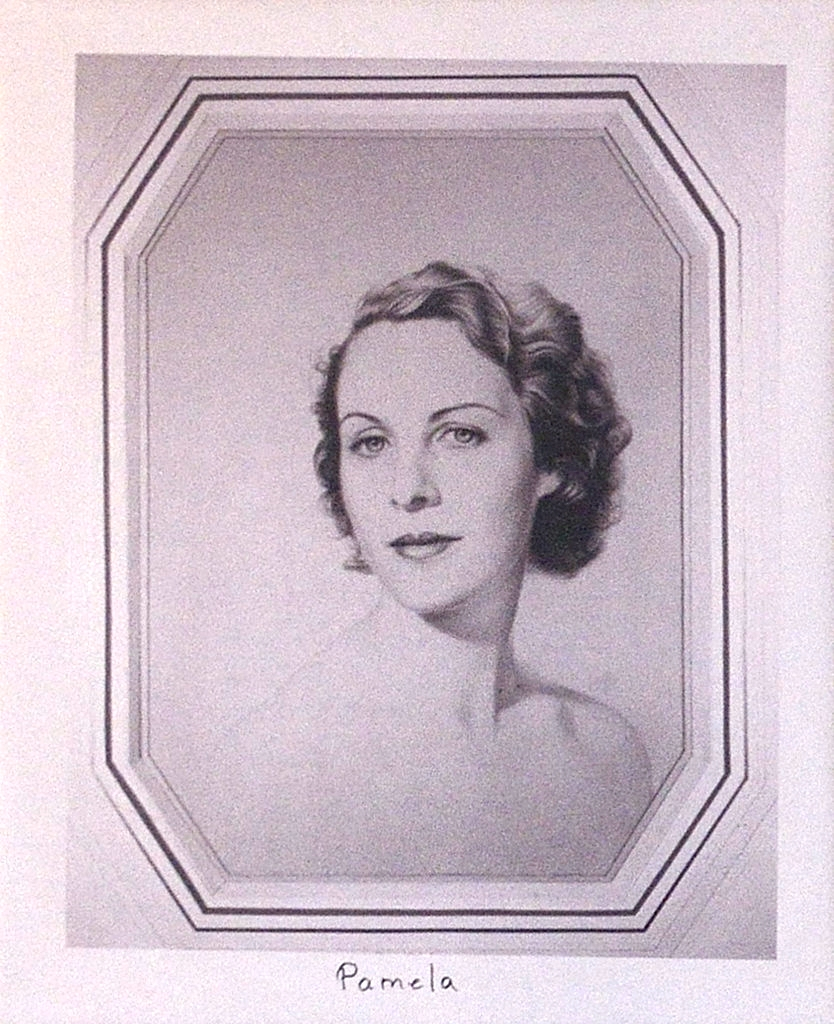
Pamela Mitford

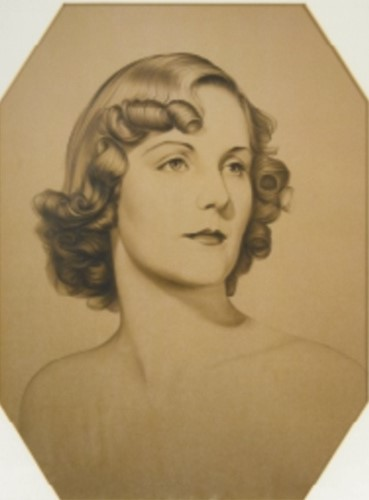
Unity Mitford

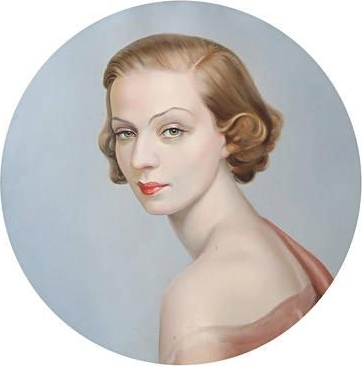
Gertrude Lawrence
