= John Drury-Lowe =

English aristocrat (1905–1960)

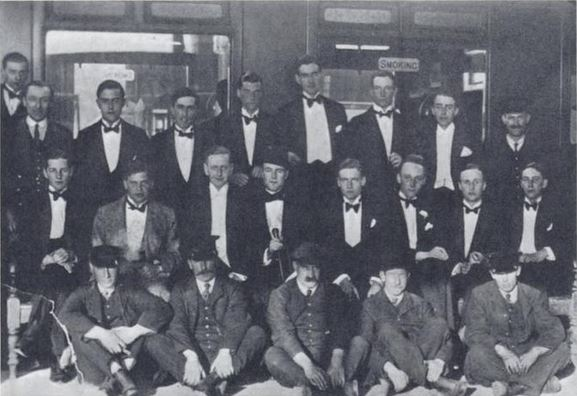
Railway Club at Oxford, coincived by John Sutro, dominated by Harold Acton. Left to right, back: Henry Yorke, Roy Harrod, Henry Weymouth, David Plunket Greene, Harry Stavordale, Brian Howard. Middle row: Michael Rosse, John Sutro, Hugh Lygon, Harold Acton, Bryan Guinness, Patrick Balfour, Mark Ogilvie-Grant, Johnny Drury-Lowe; front: porters.

Major John Drury Boteler Packe-Drury-Lowe (16 October 1905 - 1 June 1960) was an English aristocrat, part of the Bright Young Things crowd of the 1920s.

== Biography ==
John Drury Boteler Drury-Lowe was born on 16 October 1905, the son of John Alfred Edwin Drury-Lowe, High Sheriff of Derbyshire, and Dorothy Drury-Lowe.

He attended Eton College and Oxford University. At Eton his contemporaries were Bryan Guinness, 2nd Baron Moyne, Harold Acton, Michael Parsons, 6th Earl of Rosse, Henry Yorke, Robert Byron, Brian Howard. At Oxford Drury-Lowe was part of the Railway Club, which included: Henry Yorke, Roy Harrod, Henry Thynne, 6th Marquess of Bath, David Plunket Greene, Edward Henry Charles James Fox-Strangways, 7th Earl of Ilchester, Brian Howard, Michael Parsons, 6th Earl of Rosse, John Sutro, Hugh Lygon, Harold Acton, Bryan Guinness, 2nd Baron Moyne, Patrick Balfour, 3rd Baron Kinross, and Mark Ogilvie-Grant.

He was one of the most popular students at Oxford and later became a distinguished military man.

In 1930 John Drury Lowe married Rosemary Marguerite Hope-Vere, daughter of Lt-Col. James Charles Hope-Vere of Craigie Hall, and had one son Patrick John Boteler Drury-Lowe (1931–1993)

In 1936 he married Penelope Mary Packe, daughter of Edward Packe, and assumed as additional surname Packe. They had one son, Simon Jasper Packe-Drury-Lowe (born 1938). With the marriage, Prestwold Hall passed to the Drury-Lowe family and his son, Simon Jasper Packe-Drury-Low, inherited the house and estate in 1938.
