= Hypocrites' Club =

Oxford student club

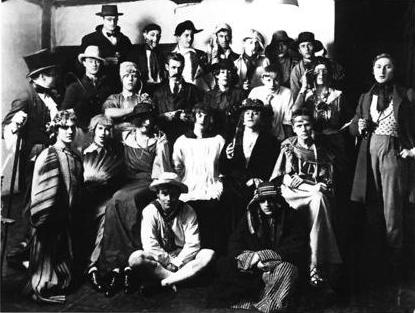
One of the Hypocrites' Club fancy dress parties

The Hypocrites' Club was one of the student clubs at Oxford University in England. Its motto in Greek, from an Olympian Ode by Pindar, was Water is best. This led to the members being called Hypocrites, because beer, wine and spirits were the chosen drinks.

== Origins ==
The Hypocrites Club was founded in 1921 by John Davies Knatchbull Lloyd, nicknamed the "Widow" after the shaving lotion "The Widow Lloyd's Euxesis". Wanting to avoid dining in hall, Lloyd and his friends got together to raise the money necessary to rent two large rooms and a kitchen over a bicycle shop, formerly a medieval house, at 31 St Aldate's (other sources said 34 or 131). The rooms were reached through a narrow staircase. They also paid for the part-time services of a cook and a servant-cum-barman. After Evelyn Waugh was introduced to the club by Terence Lucy Greenidge, many of his contemporary fellow students followed soon and the club started to change. From a place to discuss philosophy it became a place to drink and party. As Waugh remembered later it was a "process of invasion and occupation by a group of wanton Etonians who brought it to speedy dissolution". Waugh's excess drinking life habit started with the club, "It was at the university that I took to drink, discovering in a crude way the contrasting pleasures of intoxication and discrimination. Of the two, for many years, I preferred the former." A servant at the club would say: "They call themselves an artists’ club but all they draw is corks!"

== Members ==
Lord Elmley was the president of the club and Waugh was the secretary. Members included: Hugh Lygon; Lord Clonmore; Anthony Powell; Graham Pollard; Harold Acton; Robert Byron; Alfred Duggan; Mark Ogilvie-Grant; Arden Hilliard; Gavin Henderson; David Plunket Greene; Terence Lucy Greenidge; Raoul Loveday; Alastair Hugh Graham; E. E. Evans-Pritchard; Roger Hollis; Claud Cockburn; Anthony Bushell; Brian Howard; Tom Driberg; Christopher Hollis; H. D. Ziman.

=== Harold Acton ===
Talking about Harold Acton and the club, Emlyn Williams in his autobiography George (1961) said: "He's the Oxford aesthete, [...] he belongs to the Hypocrites' Club with Brian Howard and Robert Byron and Evelyn Waugh."

=== Robert Byron ===
Robert Byron, who was the resident entertainer singing Victorian music hall, joined because it provided him a haven for like-minded "aesthetes".

=== Alfred Duggan ===
Alfred Duggan joined the club to continue to drink after the pubs and bars had closed. He introduced Anthony Powell to the Club during Powell's first week in residence; while Powell was hardly able to finish a pint of the club's potent dark beer, Duggan drank a tankard of burgundy, his usual lunch-time tipple. Duggan was in his second year at Balliol College and was the son of an alcoholic, on the way to becoming one himself.

=== Tom Driberg ===
Evelyn Waugh introduced Tom Driberg to the club. Driberg remembered "dancing with John F., while Evelyn and another rolled on a sofa with (as one of them said later) their 'tongues licking each other's tonsils'."

=== Alastair Hugh Graham ===
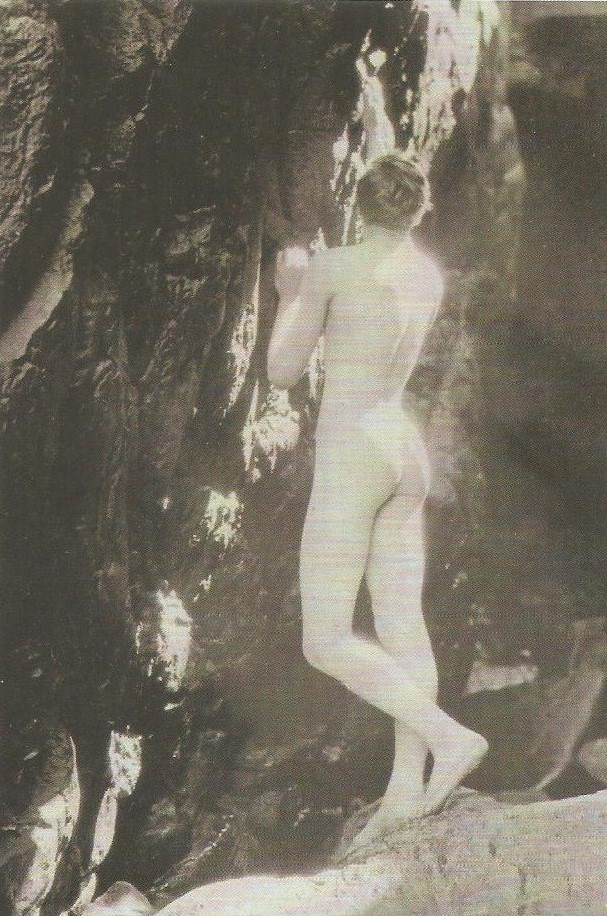
Alastair Hugh Graham

Alastair Hugh Graham followed Richard Pares as Waugh's friend of heart. Waugh called him Hamish Lennox in his writings, and said that "[he] had no repugnance to the bottle and we drank deep together. At times he was as gay as any Hypocrite, but there were always hints of the spirit that in later years has made him a recluse." Graham sent Waugh a naked photo of himself, leaning against a rock face, with arms outstretched, buttocks in full view, and with the text explaining the best way to drink wine: "You must tab a peach and peel it, and put it in a finger bowl, and pour the Burgundy over. The flavour is exquisite. With love from Alastair and his poor dead heart."

=== Arden Hilliard ===
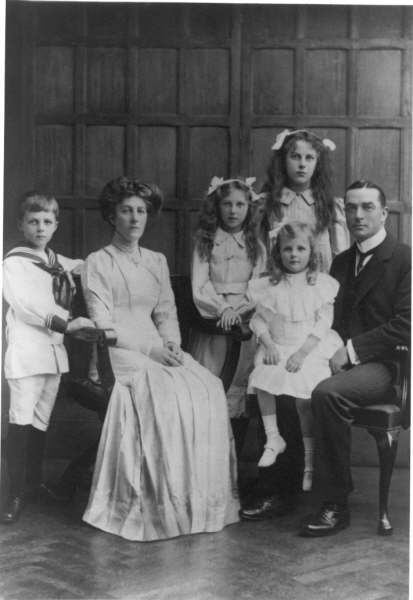
Arden Hilliard, first on the left

Arden Hilliard was born in 1904, the son of Edward Hilliard, Bursar of Balliol College, Oxford, and Kathleen Margaret Alexander Arden (1877-1939). He had three sisters, Heather Evelyn (b. 1899), Barbara Joyce (b. 1902), and Margaret Lilian Kathleen (b. 1907). In 1939 his mother Kathleen Hilliard committed suicide jumping from the roof of a private nursing home where she was treated for mental illness. Hilliard was an undergraduate at Balliol College with Anthony Powell, Matthew Ponsonby, Peter Quennell and Pierse Synnott. He was in particular friend of Ponsonby. In his autobiography To Keep the Ball Rolling, Powell, wrote of Hilliard: "[He] had come up to Oxford from Winchester, with a Balliol Exhibition, and an unmanageable burden of good looks. Handsome, nice mannered, mild in demeanour, Hilliard, at first meeting, conveyed not the smallest suggestion of his capacity for falling into trouble. The variety of ways in which he got on the wrong side of the authorities during his period of residence (prematurely cut short) was both contrarious and phenomenal. He was one of the nicest of men, in certain moods content to live a quiet even humdrum existence; at other times behaving with a minimum of discretion, altogether disregarding the traditional recommendation that, if you can't be good, be careful. [...] A vignette that remains in my mind of this early Balliol period is of being woken up one night to find Hilliard and Ponsonby standing by my bedside. Without a word, one of them held out a brimming glass of sparkling burgundy. I drained it, equally in silence." Later, on 19 September 1982, reading the obituary of John Edward Bowle, Powell remembered how at Oxford he always avoided him; Hilliard and Ponsonby instead engaged with Bowle, shortly after dropping him when his bad temper came out. In 1926 Hilliard undertook a trip to Corsica with Anthony Powell, just graduated from Balliol College; on the way back in Nice they met Hugh Lygon who was staying at W. Somerset Maugham's villa. Hilliard then took up farming. During World War II Hilliard became a captain of infantry. He was Mentioned in dispatches on 15 April 1941 in the Supplement of The London Gazette. After World War II, according to Powell, he took "an erratically charted course that had something of Jude the Obscure in reverse; erstwhile scholar who transformed himself into a rustic swain." Hilliard moved to Sussex and became the area secretary of the People's Dispensary for Sick Animals. Hilliard died on 30 August 1976. At the time of his death he was living at Sinnock Square, High Street, Hastings, Sussex.

=== Christopher Hollis ===
Christopher Hollis wrote in his memoirs, Along the Road to Frome, that "the two centres of my social life that remain most vividly in my mind are the Hypocrites' Club and Offal luncheons. The Hypocrites' Club was founded by a number of those who liked the less conventional ways, in refuge from the regular dining clubs such as the Gridiron or Vincent's, which were both too expensive and, in our opinion, too starchy. It consisted of a number of bare, uncarpeted rooms in a couple of houses beyond Christ Church and just short of Folly Bridge."

=== Brian Howard ===
At Oxford, Brian Howard and his friends were known as Hearts, mostly sons of noblemen and aspiring writers. The Isis Magazine wrote "They are rather alarming. They have succeeded in picking up a whole series of intellectual catch-phrases with which they proceed to dazzle their friends and frighten their acquaintances: and they are the only people I have ever met who have reduced rudeness to a fine art." Sir John Betjeman tells the story of a Balliol aesthete called Michael Dugdale who used to walk into Brasenose College, dominated by the Hearts, with a stick and limping, in the hope that the Hearts would be too sporting to attack him.

=== Hugh Lygon ===
Hugh Lygon, the third love-interest of Waugh at Oxford, was as hard-drinking and self-destructive as Waugh and Graham. Lygon moved round Oxford like a lost boy. Terence Lucy Greenidge remembered him carrying a teddy bear. Greenidge, while admiring Hugh's classical good looks, charm and elegance, said he was "rather empty." Lygon, along with Robert Byron, Patrick Balfour and Brian Howard, was one of the most sexually active of the Hypocrites. After Waugh published A Little Learning, Harold Acton wrote to him complaining he had revealed his homosexuality, while omitting Byron's, Balfour's, Howard's and Lygon's promiscuities. Tamara Talbot Rice, one of the few women undergraduates at Oxford, remembered how John Fothergill let Waugh have rooms in the Spreadeagle at Thame at a special midweek rate so that he and Lygon could meet in private.

=== Anthony Powell ===
Anthony Powell wrote: "Coming from different colleges, we used to lunch or dine several times a week at this inexpensive and ill-furnished club over a bicycle shop near Folly Bridge. The premises, reputed to be Tudor, were certainly very rickety. The membership, equally irregular, was in process of changing from shove-halfpenny playing Bohemians to fancy-dress wearing aesthetes. One of the rowdiest members was Evelyn Waugh, one of the most sophisticated Harold Acton."

=== E. E. Evans-Pritchard ===
E. E. Evans-Pritchard lived an aesthetic and bohemian life, a reaction to the horrors of World War I. As an undergraduate he was a member of the Hypocrites Club. There is a photograph of Evans-Pritchard at a fancy-dress party in which he is in Arab dress looking like T. E. Lawrence. Evans-Pritchard later became an anthropologist.

=== Evelyn Waugh ===
Anthony Powell's first encounter with Evelyn Waugh was a sighting of him at the Hypocrites sitting on the knee of another member, Christopher Hollis. Waugh later teased Christopher Sykes for not having had a homosexual phase. Though Waugh was friends with Terence Lucy Greenidge and Harold Acton, eccentrics and crazy, romantically he was attracted to fragile, beautiful boys like Alastair Hugh Graham and Richard Pares. After Waugh left Oxford he kept going back, and on 12 November 1924 he accepted a lunch date with John Sutro, that was indeed a surprise party at which Sutro invited all of Waugh's "old friends": Harold Acton, Mark Ogilvie-Grant, Hugh Lygon, Robert Byron, Arden Hilliard and Richard Pares. That night Waugh got into Balliol and was let out of a window for having mocked Hilliard and Powell. It was to this visit that Waugh later attributed his "decline" into alcohol.

=== H. D. Ziman ===
H. D. Ziman became the literary editor of the Daily Telegraph and was in his fourth year when he met Anthony Powell, a freshman. It was Ziman who later put Powell in contact with American publisher Ken Giniger, who wanted to produce a picture-book of Powell's series of novels, A Dance to the Music of Time.

== Elements of the club ==
=== Harrow School ===
Many who joined the club were previously students at Harrow School. John Betjeman recalled that "whenever the police raided the Hypocrites' Club or the Coconut Club, the '43 or the Blue Lantern there would always be Harrovians there."

=== Homosexuality ===
Some of the members of the club, like Brian Howard were gay, but most were not. But in any case there was a notice on the wall saying "Gentlemen may prance but not dance." At the time undergraduate students were forbidden to drink in pubs and practicing homosexuality was illegal, therefore clubs like the Hypocrites' were places to do both in a safe environment. Waugh would remember that the club became "notorious not only for drunkenness but for flamboyance of dress and manner which was in some cases patently homosexual". The "gay set" of the Hypocrites' Club listed Arden Hilliard, Hugh Lygon, Harold Acton, Mark Ogilvie-Grant, John "The Widow" Lloyd, Robert Byron, and Gavin Henderson.

=== Railway Club ===
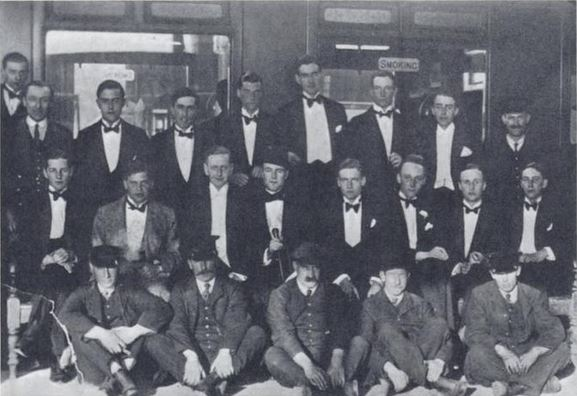
Railway Club at Oxford. Left to right, back: Henry Yorke, Roy Harrod, Henry Weymouth, David Plunket Greene, Harry Stavordale, Brian Howard. Middle row: Michael Rosse, John Sutro, Hugh Lygon, Harold Acton, Bryan Guinness, Patrick Balfour, Mark Ogilvie-Grant, Johnny Drury-Lowe; front: porters.

A contemporary club at Oxford was the Railway Club, founded by John Sutro and dominated by Harold Acton. Members included Henry Yorke; Roy Harrod; Henry Thynne, 6th Marquess of Bath; David Plunket Greene; Edward Henry Charles James Fox-Strangways, 7th Earl of Ilchester; Brian Howard; Michael Parsons, 6th Earl of Rosse; Hugh Lygon; Bryan Guinness, 2nd Baron Moyne; Patrick Balfour, 3rd Baron Kinross; Mark Ogilvie-Grant; John Drury-Lowe; Evelyn Waugh. The members of the Railway Club dined in black-tie aboard the Penzance-Aberdeen express between Oxford and Leicester.

=== The Scarlet Woman ===
The Scarlet Woman: An Ecclesiastical Melodrama was directed by Terence Lucy Greenidge, and written by Evelyn Waugh in September 1924. The cast members were: the same Evelyn Waugh, Arden Hilliard, Elsa Lanchester, John Greenidge (Terence's brother), Alec Waugh, John Sutro, the same Terence Greenidge, Septimus Nixon (real name Guy Hemingway), Derek Erskine, Michael Murgatroyd (real name William Lygon, 8th Earl Beauchamp), Archibald Gordon and Sibbald Malcolm. The absurd plot was about the Pope (Guy Hemingway) trying to convert England to Catholicism using Sligger (the Dean of Balliol, Evelyn Waugh). Greenidge, his brother John, Waugh and Sutro put 5 pounds (£263 in 2025 sterlings) each and bought a camera. Filming mostly took place in Arthur Waugh's garden at Hampstead with few other locations in London and Oxford. Most of the actors came from the Hypocrites' Club, other than Waugh's brother, Alec, and Elsa Lanchester, not yet a professional actress and managing a night club in Charlotte Street, London. Her pay was a £4 dinner. The Scarlet Woman is Evelyn Waugh's only movie and was never shown in public; it had private screenings in London and Oxford. Christopher Sykes says it "became a legend rather than an experience" for most of Waugh's friends. Father C. C. Martindale of Campion Hall, a Catholic house in the University of Oxford, saw it and "laughed till his tears flowed".

== Closure ==
The club's mischief began to be noticed by the Oxford authorities when William Howard, 8th Earl of Wicklow, gave a supper party on the roof of a church. In early 1924, Robert Byron and Harold Acton were forbidden by the university authorities to stage an 1840s Exhibition event. On 8 March 1924 a Victorian fancy dress party was hosted at the club by Robert Byron and The Widow Lloyd as a protest. Some members dressed in feminine apparel - Arden Hilliard masqueraded as a nun - and there was also a choirboy with lips painted vermillion. That night Hilliard went through the gate of Balliol in his nun costume and was promptly dismissed by the college - where his father was Bursar. The club was finally closed down sometime after this party by the dean of Balliol College, Oxford, "Sligger" Urquhart.

Waugh's revenge for the closure of the Club was to enter Balliol late at night and shout in the quad, "The Dean of Balliol sleeps with men!". Balliol College and the Hypocrites' Club were the epicentres of what James Lees-Milne called "that scintillating generation... a mixture of the socially sophisticated and the enviably gifted... notably Twentyish and also alarming."

The premises of the club were then rented by former member Richard Plunket Greene. Robert Byron's biographer James Knox described Richard and his brother David as a "wildly irresponsible pair who had never experienced any form of parental control." In September 1924 Alastair Hugh Graham revisited the club location with Waugh, but Waugh "hated 31 St. Aldate's for its discomfort and its associations". Later however, in his autobiography, Waugh would write that the club had been the "source of friendships still warm today." The Hypocrites Club's premises are now social housing.

== Aftermath ==
In 1936, Major Guy Richard Charles Wyndham (1896 - 19 May 1948), who was a painter and author of the autobiographical novel The Gentle Savage under the name of Richard Wyndham, issued invitations to a "remarkable" dinner that reads: "To Welcome Home Aginejok. Richard Wyndham invites you to a Dinka Dinner to be held in the Bahr-el-Ghazal Room, Savoy Hotel, at 8.0 p.m. on September 2nd. It is hoped that after-dinner speakers will stand on one leg." Aginejok was the native name for the friendly district commissioner who had been his host in the Sudan. Among the invited guests many were former Hypocrites or friends of them. They were: Tom Driberg, Montague Shearman, Hon. David Tennant, R. J. Brock, Arden Hilliard, E. A. Boyce, St John Hutchinson, K.C., Ralph Keene, Peter Quennell, John Heygate, Sacheverell Sitwell, Curtis Moffat, Freddy Mayor, Desmond Flower, 10th Viscount Ashbrook, Hon. Patrick Balfour, 3rd Baron Kinross, Major W. R. Barker, Capt. J. S. Poole, Capt. F. O. Cave, and A. J. A. Symons. The dinner was so remarkable that it is remembered in at least two memoirs: Tom Driberg: his life and indiscretions and A. J. A. Symons: His Life and Speculations.

== Legacy ==
The members of the club became the main inspiration of Waugh's novel Brideshead Revisited.

== Gallery ==
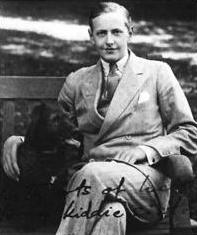
Hugh Lygon

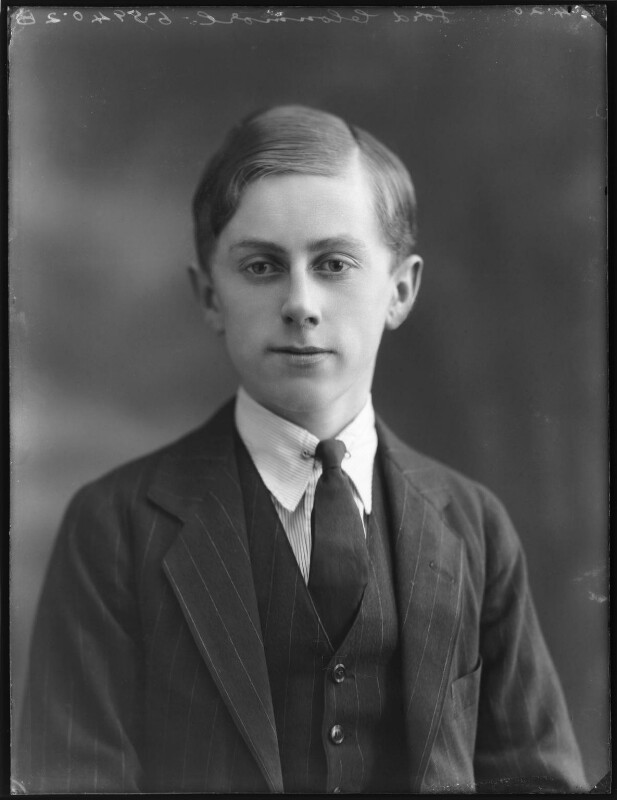
William Howard, 8th Earl of Wicklow

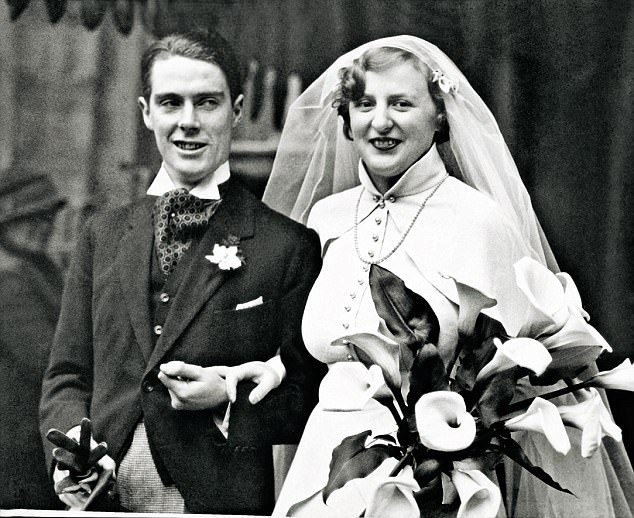
Anthony Powell

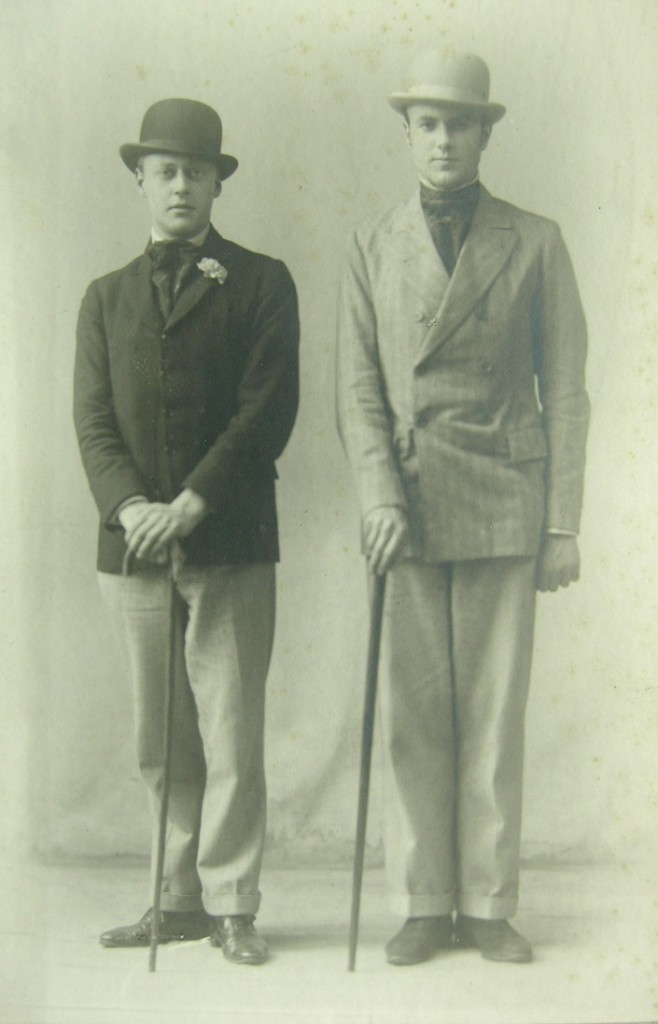
Robert Byron and Harold Acton

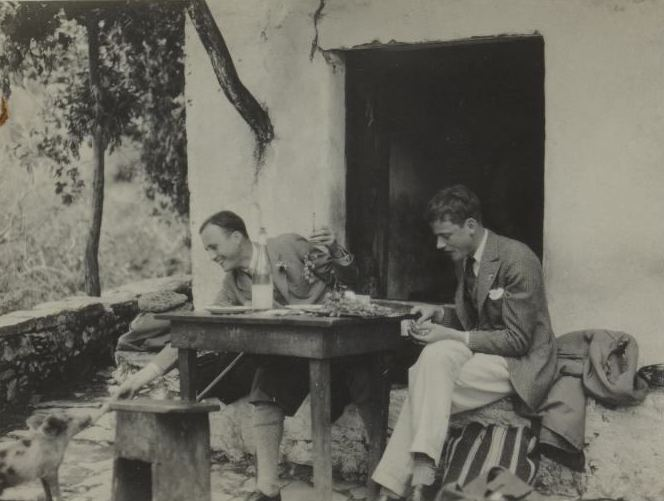
Robert Byron and Desmond Parsons

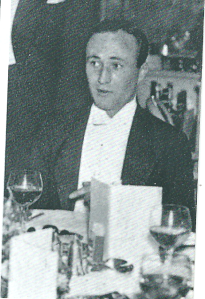
Mark Ogilvie-Grant

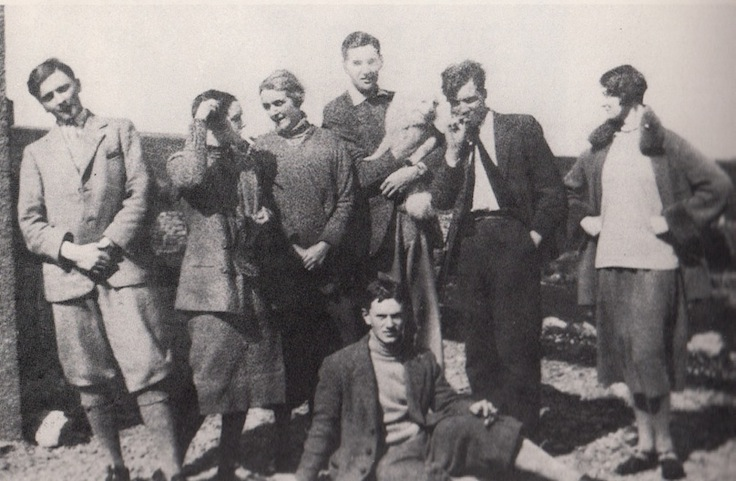
Richard Plunket Greene, first from the left, Olivia Plunket Greene, second from left, David Plunket Greene, holding the dog, Terence Lucy Greenidge, smoking, second from right, Elizabeth Frances Russell, first from the right, Evelyn Waugh, sitting down

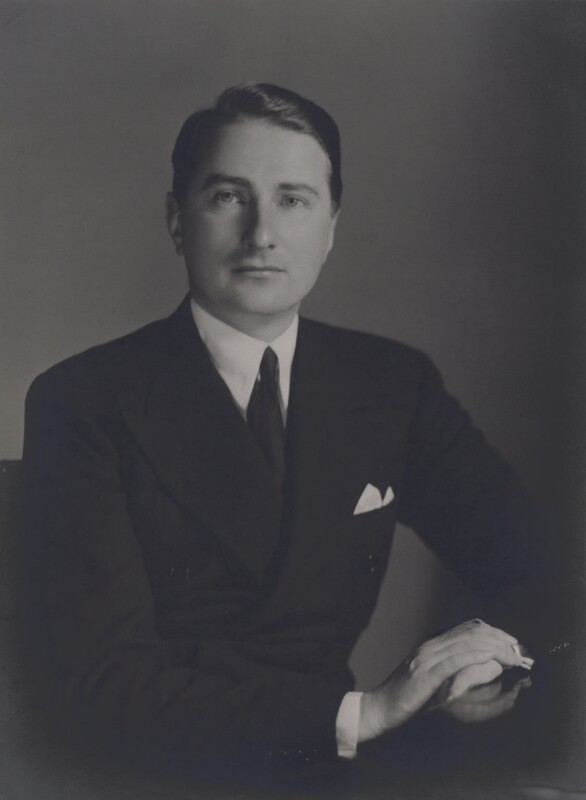
(Alexander) Gavin Henderson, 2nd Baron Faringdon
