= Roy Harrod =

English economist (1900–1978)

Sir Roy Harrod
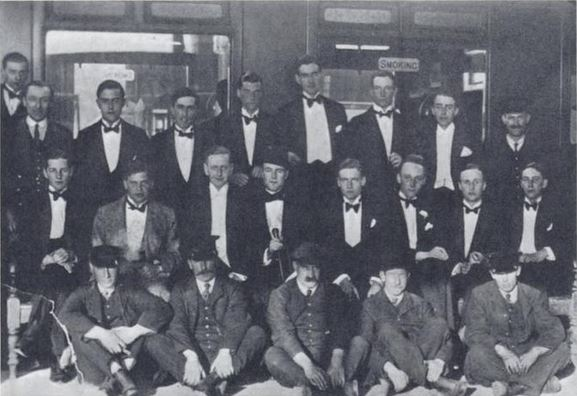
- The Railway Club. (Left to right) Back: Henry Yorke, Roy Harrod, Henry Weymouth, David Plunket Greene, Harry Stavordale, Brian Howard. Middle row: Michael Rosse, John Sutro, Hugh Lygon, Harold Acton, Bryan Guinness, Patrick Balfour, Mark Ogilvie-Grant, Johnny Drury-Lowe. Front: porters
- Born: Henry Roy Forbes Harrod; 13 February 1900; London, England
- Died: 8 March 1978 (aged 78); Holt, Norfolk, England
- Spouse: Billa Harrod

Academic background
- Education: New College, Oxford; King's College, Cambridge
- Influences: John Maynard Keynes, John A. Hobson

Academic work
- School or tradition: Post-Keynesian economics
- Notable ideas: Harrod–Domar model

Sir Henry Roy Forbes Harrod (13 February 1900 – 8 March 1978) was an English economist. He is best known for writing The Life of John Maynard Keynes (1951) and for the development of the Harrod–Domar model, which he and Evsey Domar developed independently. He is also known for his International Economics, a former standard textbook of international economics, the first edition of which contained some observations and ruminations (wanting in subsequent editions) that would foreshadow theories developed independently by later scholars (such as the Balassa–Samuelson effect).

== Biography ==
Harrod was born in London to businessman Henry Dawes Harrod and novelist Frances Forbes-Robertson. He attended St Paul's School and then Westminster School. Harrod attended New College in Oxford on a history scholarship. After a brief period in the Artillery, he gained a first in literae humaniores in 1921, and a first in modern history the following year. Afterwards he spent some time in 1922 at King's College, Cambridge. It was there that he met and befriended John Maynard Keynes.

After moving back to Oxford, he became a Student (i.e., Fellow) and Tutor in economics at Christ Church. He held the fellowship in modern history and economics until 1967. He remained in contact with Keynes until Keynes's death in 1946, and was later his biographer (1951). Harrod was additionally a Fellow at Nuffield College 1938 to 1947 and from 1954 to 1958.

At Oxford Harrod was part of the Railway Club, which included: Henry Yorke, Henry Thynne, 6th Marquess of Bath, David Plunket Greene, Edward Henry Charles James Fox-Strangways, 7th Earl of Ilchester, Brian Howard, Michael Parsons, 6th Earl of Rosse, John Sutro, Hugh Lygon, Harold Acton, Bryan Guinness, 2nd Baron Moyne, Patrick Balfour, 3rd Baron Kinross, Mark Ogilvie-Grant, John Drury-Lowe.

During the Second World War, he was briefly in Winston Churchill's "S-branch" – a statistical section within the Admiralty.

At the 1945 General Election, he stood as Liberal candidate for Huddersfield and finished third of three candidates, with 16.2% of the vote.

In 1966, Harrod, was the 2nd winner of the prestigious Bernhard-Harms-Preis. After retiring in 1967, he moved to Holt, Norfolk.

Interviewed for the book Authors take Sides on Vietnam, Harrod declared himself a supporter of the American military campaign in Indochina.

Assar Lindbeck, the former chairman of the Nobel Prize Committee, wrote that Harrod would have been awarded a Nobel Memorial Prize in Economic Sciences if he had lived longer.

Harrod married Wilhelmine "Billa" Cresswell (1911–2005), step-daughter of General Sir Peter Strickland, in 1938. One of their sons was Dominick Harrod, an economics correspondent for the BBC.

== The Life of John Maynard Keynes ==
After the death of his Cambridge friend and colleague, the economist John Maynard Keynes, in 1946, Harrod and Austin Robinson wrote a lengthy obituary of Keynes for The Economic Journal. At the encouragement of Geoffrey Keynes, Harrod then undertook the task of writing a major biography of Keynes. The Life of John Maynard Keynes was published to widespread acclaim in 1951, at a time when most of Keynes's family and friends were still alive.

With the post-war influence of so-called Keynesian economics and then challenges to it, cultural interest in the Bloomsbury Group, and the publication of thirty volumes of The Collected Writings of John Maynard Keynes in the 1970s and 1980s, high interest in Keynes's life led to further biographies, most prominently by Robert Skidelsky and Donald Moggridge, and to detailed studies such as by Donald Markwell on Keynes and international relations. These works have corrected and added details to the Keynes depicted by Harrod, and Skidelsky in particular has contrasted his account of Keynes with what he has depicted as Harrod's hagiography.

== List of works ==
- "Doctrines of Imperfect Competition," Quarterly Journal of Economics 48 (May 1934), 442–470.
- "The expansion of Credit in an Advancing Community", Economica NS 1 (August 1934), 287–299.
- The Trade Cycle (Oxford: Clarendon Press, 1936).
- "Utilitarianism Revised," Mind 45 (April 1936), 137–156.
- "Mr. Keynes and Traditional Theory," Econometrica NS 5 (January 1937), 74–86.
- "Scope and Method of Economics," Economic Journal 48 (Sept. 1938), 383–412.
- "An Essay in Dynamic Theory," Economic Journal 49 (March 1939), 14–33.
- International economics (London: Nisbet, and Cambridge: Cambridge University Press; New York: Harcourt and Brace). Five editions from 1933 to 1973.
- Towards a Dynamic Economics (London: Macmillan, 1948)
- The Life of John Maynard Keynes (London: Macmillan, 1951)
- "Economic Essays" (London: Macmillan, 1952)
- Foundations of Inductive Logic (1956).
- The Prof: A Personal Memoir of Lord Cherwell (London, Macmillan, 1959)
- "Domar and Dynamic Economics," Economic Journal 69 (September 1959), 451–464.
- "Second Essay in Dynamic Theory," Economic Journal 70 (June 1960), 277–293.
- "Themes in Dynamic Theory," Economic Journal 73 (September 1963), 401–421.
- "Money" (London: Macmillan, 1969)
- Sociology, Morals and Mystery, (London: Macmillan, 1970).
- Economic Dynamics (London: Macmillan, 1973).
- The Interwar Correspondence of Roy Harrod (Cheltenham: Elgar, 2003).

== Honours ==
Harrod was knighted in the 1959 New Year Honours.

== Legacy ==
The Harrod Papers are housed at the British Library. The papers can be accessed through the British Library catalogue.

== Notes ==
=== Bibliography ===
- Durlauf, Steven N.; Blume, Lawrence E., eds. (2016). "Harrod, Roy Forbes (1900–1978)". The New Palgrave Dictionary of Economics. Palgrave Macmillan UK. ISBN 978-1349588022.
- Henderson, David R., ed. (2008). "Roy F. Harrod (1900–1978)". The Concise Encyclopedia of Economics. Library of Economics and Liberty (2nd ed.). Liberty Fund. p. 539. ISBN 978-0865976665.
