= Harry Fox-Strangways, 7th Earl of Ilchester =

British peer and philanthropist

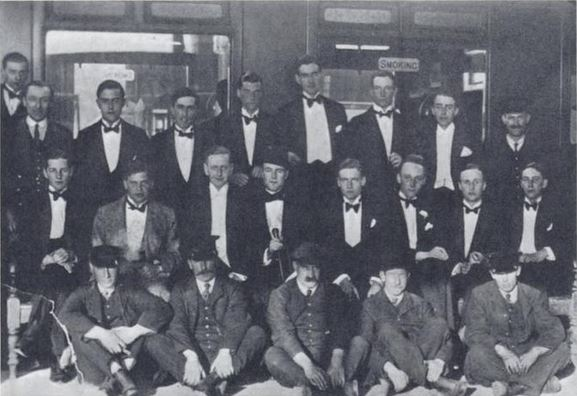
Railway Club at Oxford, conceived by John Sutro, dominated by Harold Acton. Left to right, back: Henry Yorke, Roy Harrod, Henry Weymouth, David Plunket Greene, Harry Stavordale, Brian Howard. Middle row: Michael Rosse, John Sutro, Hugh Lygon, Harold Acton, Bryan Guinness, Patrick Balfour, Mark Ogilvie-Grant, Johnny Drury-Lowe; front: porters.

Edward Henry Charles James "Harry" Fox-Strangways, 7th Earl of Ilchester GBE DL (1 October 1905 – 21 August 1964) was a British peer and philanthropist. He also held the subsidiary titles of Baron Strangways and Baron Ilchester and Stavordale.

== Biography ==
He was educated at Eton College and Christ Church, Oxford, where he was part of the Railway Club, which included: Henry Yorke, Roy Harrod, Henry Thynne, 6th Marquess of Bath, David Plunket Greene, Fox-Strangways, Brian Howard, Michael Parsons, 6th Earl of Rosse, John Sutro, Hugh Lygon, Harold Acton, Bryan Guinness, 2nd Baron Moyne, Patrick Balfour, 3rd Baron Kinross, Mark Ogilvie-Grant, John Drury-Lowe.

He used the first name "Harry" and served as a Deputy Lieutenant of Dorset in 1957.

== Family ==
He married Helen Elizabeth Ward, granddaughter of William Ward, 1st Earl of Dudley, on 27 April 1931. They had three children:

- Lady Theresa Jane Fox-Strangways (12 August 1932 - 1989), married Simon Monckton-Arundell, 9th Viscount Galway
- Giles Henry Holland Fox-Strangways (7 May 1934 - 2 September 1947, accidental death)
- Charles Stephen Fox-Strangways (6 May 1938 - 8 July 1958, killed while on emergency military operations in Cyprus)

With no surviving male issue, he was succeeded in the Earldom of Ilchester by Walter Angelo Fox-Strangways, a descendant of the 1st Earl of Ilchester and Harry's fifth cousin, once removed, but his family seat of Melbury House in Dorset and large estates were inherited by his daughter Theresa, Viscountess Galway.

== Arms ==
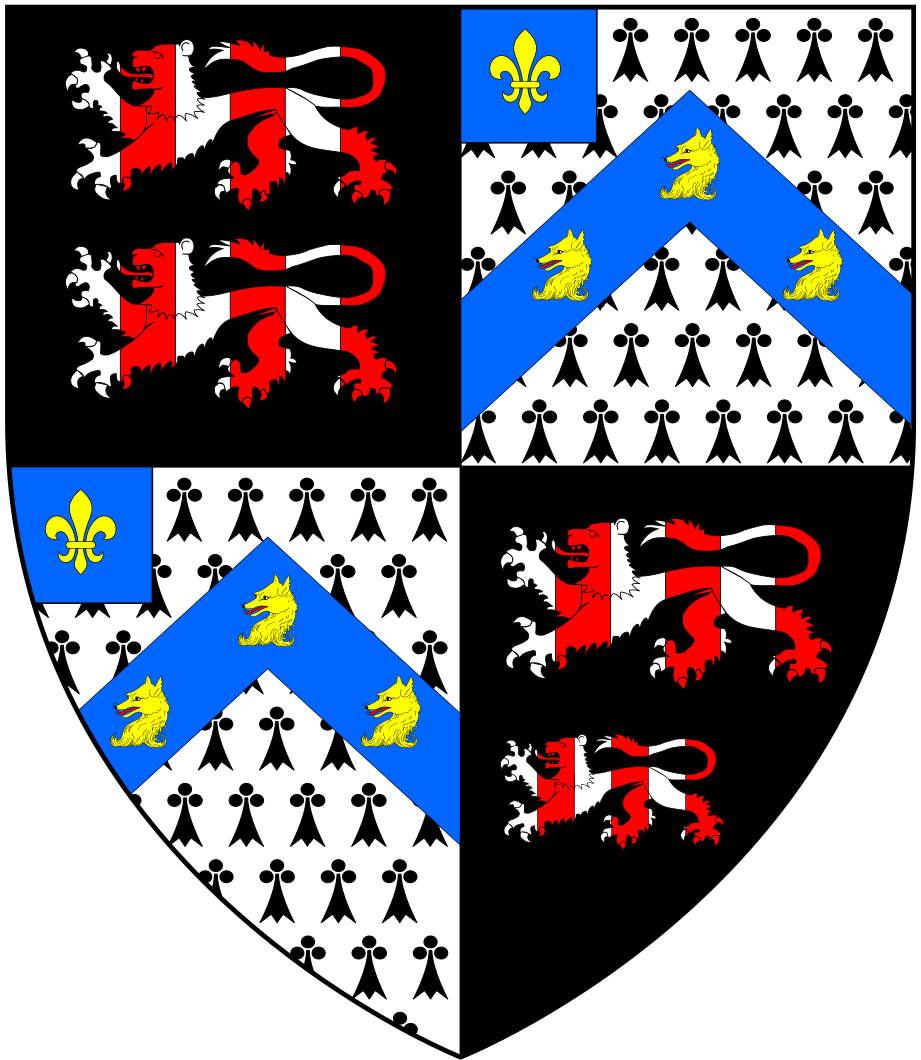
Arms of Fox-Strangways

The arms of the head of the Fox-Strangways family are blazoned Quarterly of four: 1st & 4th: Sable, two lions passant paly of six argent and gules (Strangways); 2nd & 3rd: Ermine, on a chevron azure three foxes' heads and necks erased or on a canton of the second a fleur-de-lys of the third (Fox).

Peerage of Great Britain
Preceded by Giles Fox-Strangways	Earl of Ilchester; 1959–1964	Succeeded by Walter Fox-Strangways
