= Mark Ogilvie-Grant =

British diplomat & botanist (1905-1969)

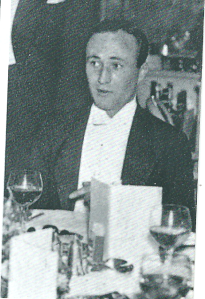
Mark Ogilvie-Grant

Charles Randolph Mark Ogilvie-Grant (15 March 1905 – 13 February 1969) was a British diplomat and a botanist and one of the earliest members of the Bright Young Things. Despite his earliest frivolous past, he became a hero during the 1940–1941 Greek campaign.

== Biography ==
(Charles Randolph) Mark Ogilvie-Grant was born on 15 March 1905, the first son of ornithologist William Robert Ogilvie-Grant and Maud Louisa Pechell, daughter of Admiral Mark Robert Pechell.

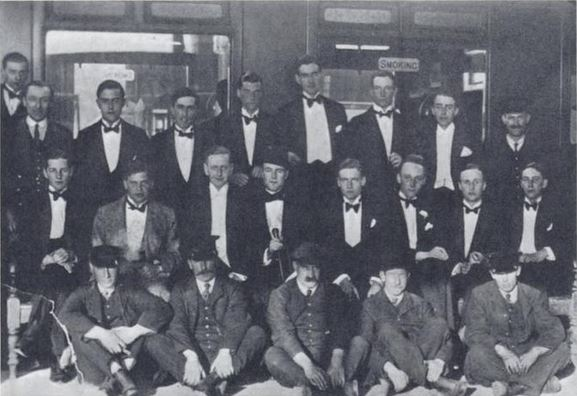
Railway Club at Oxford, conceived by John Sutro, dominated by Harold Acton. Left to right, back: Henry Yorke, Roy Harrod, Henry Weymouth, David Plunket Greene, Harry Stavordale, Brian Howard. Middle row: Michael Rosse, John Sutro, Hugh Lygon, Harold Acton, Bryan Guinness, Patrick Balfour, Mark Ogilvie-Grant, Johnny Drury-Lowe; front: porters.

He attended Eton College where he met his long-lasting friends Brian Howard and Robert Byron. With them he was an early member of the Bright Young Things. He then moved to Trinity College, Oxford, where he was part of a group including Harold Acton, Robert Byron, Henry Vincent Yorke, Henry Thynne, 6th Marquess of Bath, David Plunket Greene, Brian Howard, John Sutro, Hugh Lygon, Bryan Guinness, 2nd Baron Moyne, Patrick Balfour, 3rd Baron Kinross. At Oxford Ogilvie-Grant was part of the Railway Club, which included: Henry Yorke, Roy Harrod, Henry Thynne, 6th Marquess of Bath, David Plunket Greene, Edward Henry Charles James Fox-Strangways, 7th Earl of Ilchester, Brian Howard, Michael Parsons, 6th Earl of Rosse, John Sutro, Hugh Lygon, Harold Acton, Bryan Guinness, 2nd Baron Moyne, Patrick Balfour, 3rd Baron Kinross, and John Drury-Lowe. Together with Harold Acton, William Howard, 8th Earl of Wicklow, Hugh Lygon, and Robert Byron, Ogilvie-Grant was part of the "Oxford Set" that attended the Hypocrites' Club. He was a member of the "Georgeoisie" with Alan Pryce-Jones, a group of students who dined every night at the George restaurant. He graduated in 1929 with a Bachelor of Arts (B.A.)

He was a distant cousin of Nina Caroline Studley-Herbert, 12th Countess of Seafield, another Bright Young Thing, daughter of his uncle, James Ogilvie-Grant, 11th Earl of Seafield. For this reason, Cullen Castle, in Banffshire, home of Nina Seafield, became one of the retreats of the Bright Young Things. Among the friends who joined their parties were Nancy Mitford and Hamish St. Clair-Erskine. He was one of the closest friends and confidant of Nancy Mitford, became a frequent guest at Mitford's family house at Swinbrook and he inspired the character of Sir Ivor King in the 1940 novel Pigeon Pie. He illustrated Mitford's books, Christmas Pudding and Highland Fling. He did also the portrait of Brian Howard which appeared in the Cherwell in 1927.

Mark Ogilvie-Grant was an honorary attaché in Athens, Greece, between 1927 and 1929 together with Alastair Hugh Graham, who was by then his lover, and they lived together. In the winter of 1926–1927, Evelyn Waugh visited them (he was a very close friend of Graham) and he was "disgusted by the life they led in Greece". In 1929 he was transferred in Cairo, Egypt, with Graham and Vivian Cornelius. Waugh and his wife Evelyn Gardner stayed for two days with Graham and Ogilvie-Grant, and this time, Waugh "had fun" but Gardner felt was out of place.

While in Cairo he met Wilhelmine Cresswell, who lived in Cairo with her step-father, Sir Peter Strickland, general officer commanding. When Cresswell married Roy Harrod, Ogilvie-Grant became a close friend of Harrod's family, and was godfather to Harrod's oldest son, Henry Mark Harrod. In 1933 Patrick Leigh Fermor walked by foot from London to Constantinople, he carried with him Ogilvie-Grant's rucksack that he used when, with David Talbot Rice and Robert Byron, they went on a trip to Mt. Athos, later described by Byron in The Station (1928). For Fermor the rucksack, "weathered and faded by Macedonian suns," was a valuable relic, "rife with mana."

Mark Ogilvie-Grant was also a botanist and in 1940 he contributed an essay, Plants and Western Crete to New Flora and Silva by Evan Hillhouse Methven Cox. His love of plants may in part have been inherited from his father, who worked in the Botany Department of the Natural History Museum.

During World War II, Mark Ogilvie-Grant was a Captain in the Scots Guards and was recruited by Brigadier Dudley Clarke to be part of the "A" Force, a deception department set up in Cairo in March 1941. After leaving the "A" Force, he was secretly infiltrated into enemy-occupied Greece. He was taken off Greece by boat and returned by submarine in September 1941. Among other 200 evaders in the Taygetos, he lived under conditions of semi-starvation while trying to escape through the mountains, walking under the hot Grecian sun by day and in freezing conditions by night. Around 1943 he was again prisoner of a War Camp in Austria, and escaped again. He was recaptured after three weeks and transferred in a prisoners camp in Germany. From 1947 to 1969 he was with the Information Department at the Greek Embassy in London.

In 1959 John Murray distributed in Great Britain, Helani Vlachos's book Mosaic, translated into English by Mark Ogilvie-Grant.

He spent his last years at 71 Kew Green, Kew, a place he called Vocal Lodge, and where Nancy Mitford was often a guest and where she worked on the script of the Ealing comedy Kind Hearts and Coronets.

Mark Ogilvie-Grant died on 13 February 1969.
