= Harold Acton =

British writer (1904–1994)

Sir Harold Acton CBE
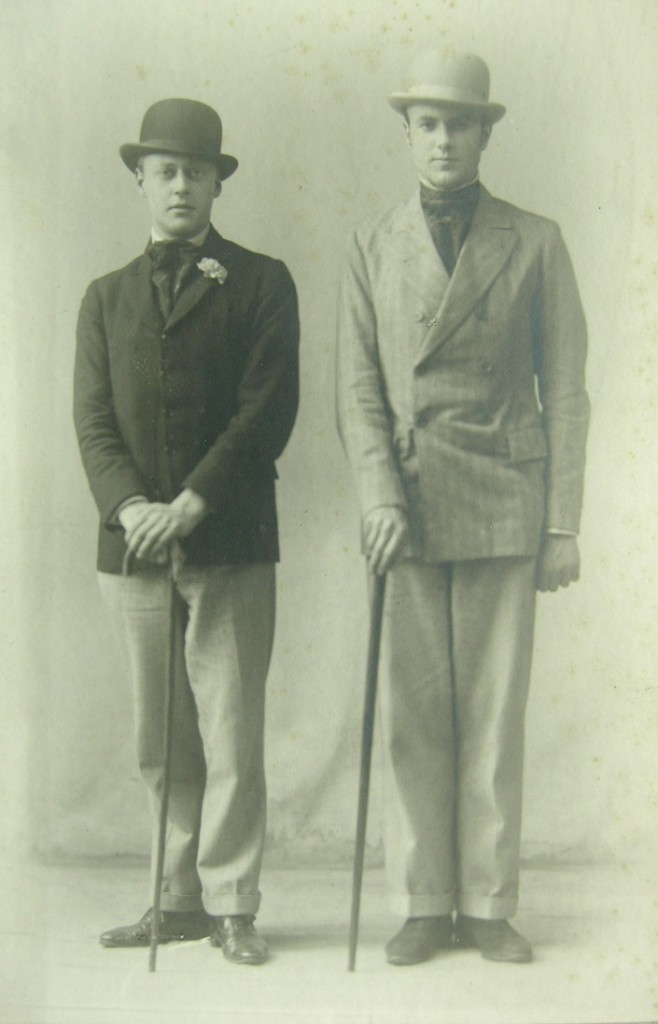
- Robert Byron (left) with Harold Acton at Oxford around 1922
- Born: 5 July 1904; Villa La Pietra, near Florence, Italy
- Died: 27 February 1994 (aged 89); Villa La Pietra, Tuscany, Italy
- Education: Oxford University
- Occupations: poet, historical writer
- Relatives: John Dalberg-Acton
- Writing career
- Language: English, Italian, French
- Notable works: The Last of the Medici (1930, 1932); Modern Chinese Poetry (with S.-H. Ch'en, 1936); Peonies and Ponies (1941, 1983); Memoirs of an Aesthete (1948); The [Last] Bourbons of Naples (1956, 1961); Ferdinando Galiani (1960); Florence (with M. Huerlimann, 1960); Nancy Mitford (1975); The Peach Blossom Fan (with S.-H. Ch'en, 1976)
- Notable awards: CBE (1965) knighted (1974)

Sir Harold Mario Mitchell Acton CBE (5 July 1904 – 27 February 1994) was a British writer, scholar, and aesthete who was a prominent member of the Bright Young Things. He wrote fiction, biography, history and autobiography. During his stay in China, he studied the Chinese language, traditional drama, and poetry, some of which he translated.

He was born near Florence, Italy, to a prominent Anglo-Italian family. At Eton College, he was a founding member of the Eton Arts Society before going up to Oxford to read Modern Greats at Christ Church. He co-founded the avant-garde magazine The Oxford Broom and mixed with many intellectual and literary figures of the age, including Evelyn Waugh, who based the character of Anthony Blanche in Brideshead Revisited partly on him. Between the wars, Acton lived in Paris, London, and Florence, proving most successful as a historian, his magnum opus being a three-volume study of the Medicis and the Bourbons.

After serving as an RAF liaison officer in the Mediterranean, he returned to Florence, restoring his childhood home, Villa La Pietra, to its earlier glory. Acton was knighted in 1974 and died in Florence, leaving La Pietra to New York University.

== Early years ==
=== Background ===
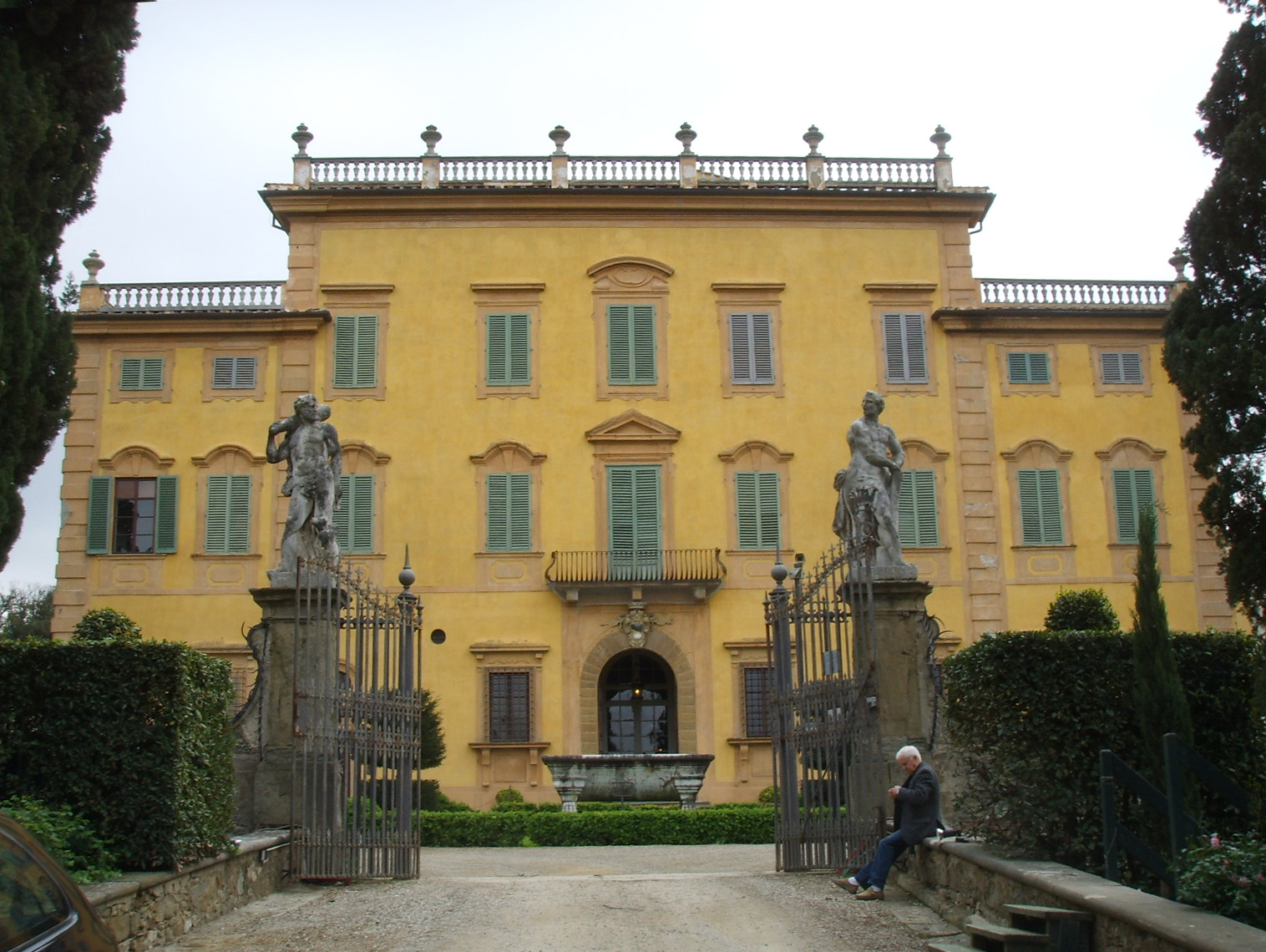
Villa La Pietra

Acton was born to a prominent Anglo-Italian-American family of baronets, later raised to the peerage as Barons Acton of Aldenham at Villa La Pietra, his parents' house one mile outside the walls of Florence, Italy. He claimed that his great-great-grandfather was Commodore Sir John Acton, 6th Baronet (1736–1811), who married his niece, Mary Anne Acton, and who was prime minister of Naples under Ferdinand IV and grandfather of the Catholic historian Lord Acton. This relationship has been disproven; Harold Acton in fact descends from Sir John Acton's brother, General Joseph Edward Acton (1737–1830). Both of these brothers served in Italy, and are from the Shropshire family of Actons.

His father was the successful art collector and dealer Arthur Acton (1873–1953), the illegitimate son of Eugene Arthur Roger Acton (1836–1895), and counsellor to the Egyptian Ministry of Agriculture and Commerce. His mother, Hortense Lenore Mitchell (1871–1962), was the heiress of John J. Mitchell, a president of the Illinois Trust and Savings Bank, an appointed member of the Federal Advisory Council,, and a trustee of the Art Institute of Chicago (1908–1909). Arthur Acton met Hortense in Chicago while helping to design the Italianate features of the bank's new building in 1896, and the Mitchell fortune allowed Arthur Acton to buy the remarkable Villa La Pietra on the hills of Florence, where Harold Acton lived for much of his life. The only modern furniture in the villa was in the nurseries, and that was disposed of when the children got older (Harold's younger brother William Acton was born in 1906).

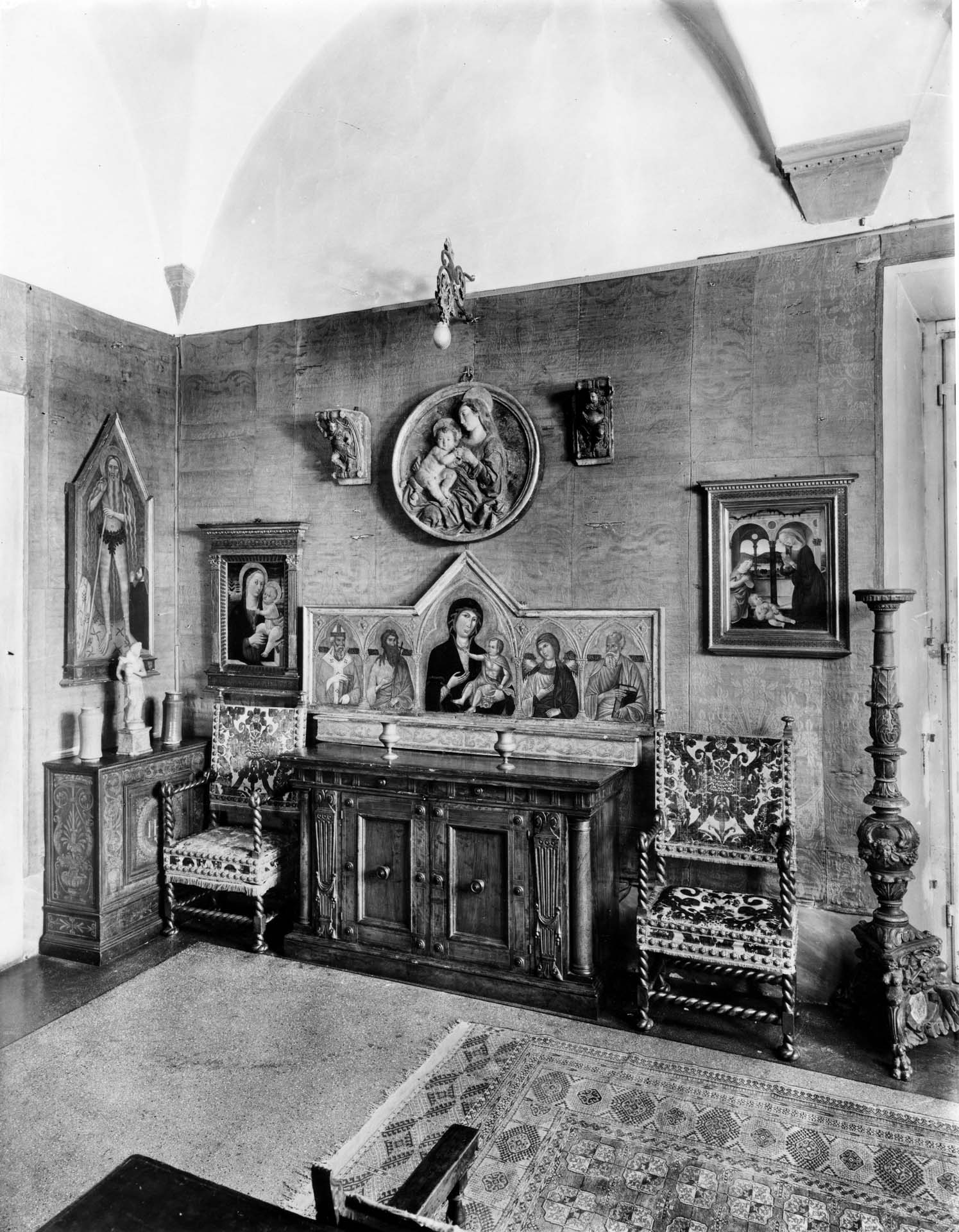
Sala del Crocifisso, Villa La Pietra, Florence, photo by Foto Reali, Foto Reali Archive, Department of Image Collections, National Gallery of Art Library, Washington, DC

== Career and education ==
His early schooling was at Miss Penrose's private school in Florence. In 1913, his parents sent him to Wixenford Preparatory School near Reading in southern England, where Kenneth Clark was a fellow-pupil. By 1916 submarine attacks on shipping had made the journey to England unsafe and so Harold and his brother were sent in September to Chateau de Lancy, an international school near Geneva. In the autumn of 1917, he went to a 'crammers' at Ashlawn in Kent to be prepared for Eton, which he entered on 1 May 1918. Among his contemporaries at Eton were Eric Blair (the writer George Orwell), Cyril Connolly, Robert Byron, Alec Douglas-Home, Ian Fleming, Brian Howard, Oliver Messel, Anthony Powell, Steven Runciman, and Henry Yorke (the novelist Henry Green). In his final years at school, Acton became a founding member of the Eton Arts Society, and eleven of his poems appeared in The Eton Candle, edited by his friend Brian Howard.

=== Oxford years ===
In October 1923, Acton went up to Oxford to read Modern Greats at Christ Church. It was from the balcony of his rooms in Meadow Buildings that he declaimed passages from The Waste Land through a megaphone (an episode recounted in Brideshead Revisited, through the character Anthony Blanche). While at Oxford, he co-founded the avant-garde magazine The Oxford Broom, and published his first book of poems, Aquarium (1923). Acton was regarded as a leading figure of his day and would often receive more attention in memoirs of the period than men who were much more successful in later life; for example, the Welsh playwright Emlyn Williams described this encounter with Acton in his autobiography George (1961):

"Bowing with the courtesy of another age and clime, he spoke, an English flawlessly italianated [sic]. 'I do most dreadfully beg your pardons this inclement night – though I have been resident a year, I find it too idiotically difficult to find my way about, I have been round Tom like a tee-toe-tum, too too madd-ening – where does our dear Dean hang out?' He thanked me profusely, raised the bowler with a dazzling smile, and propelled himself Deanward, an Oriental diplomat off to leave a jewelled carte de visite. 'Jesus,' said Evvers, 'what's that?' 'He's the Oxford aesthete,' I informed him, 'a Victorian, his rooms in Meadow are in lemon yellow and he stands on his balcony and reads his poems through a megaphone to people passing, and he belongs to the Hypocrites' Club with Brian Howard and Robert Byron and Evelyn Waugh and all that set, they call themselves the Post-War Generation and wear Hearts on their lapels as opposed to the pre-war Rupert Brooke lot who called themselves Souls. They're supposed to eat new-born babies cooked in wine.'"

Williams also described Acton's review of The Picture of Dorian Gray in the Oxford student newspaper Cherwell: "a charming boy's book, we would suggest a cheap edition to fit comfortably into the pocket of a school blazer"; and summarised Acton's modernist approach to literature: "But if one finds the words, my dears, there is beauty in a black-pudding."

In 1925, Graham Greene wrote to his future wife: 'The person I miss most now that I'm away ... is Harold ... Although I wouldn't admit it to anyone else his attack on me in The Cherwell was the best and most useful criticism I've ever had, and any alterations I try to make in my stuff is founded on it'. Twenty-five year later Greene wrote to Evelyn Waugh of having visited their mutual friend in Florence: 'How nice & dear he is, & and how I didn't realise it as Oxford'.

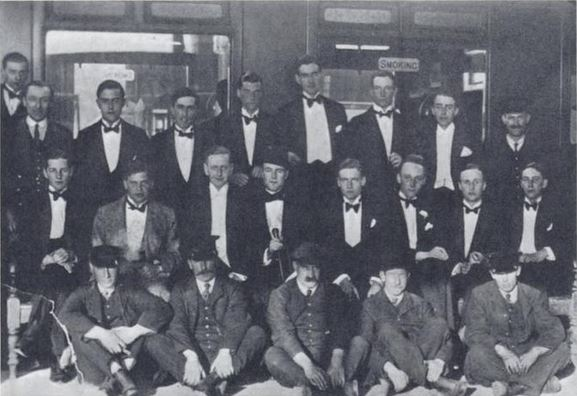
Railway Club at Oxford, conceived by John Sutro, dominated by Harold Acton. Left to right, back: Henry Yorke, Roy Harrod, Henry Weymouth, David Plunket Greene, Harry Stavordale, Brian Howard. Middle row: Michael Rosse, John Sutro, Hugh Lygon, Harold Acton, Bryan Guinness, Patrick Balfour, Mark Ogilvie-Grant, Johnny Drury-Lowe; front: porters.

At Oxford Acton dominated the Railway Club, which included: Henry Yorke; Roy Harrod; Henry Thynne, 6th Marquess of Bath; David Plunket Greene; Edward Henry Charles James Fox-Strangways, 7th Earl of Ilchester; Brian Howard; Michael Parsons, 6th Earl of Rosse; John Sutro; Hugh Lygon; Harold Acton; Bryan Guinness, 2nd Baron Moyne; Patrick Balfour, 3rd Baron Kinross; Mark Ogilvie-Grant, John Drury-Lowe.

=== Influence on Waugh ===
Evelyn Waugh populated his novels with composite characters based upon individuals he knew. Acton is reputed to have inspired, at least in part, the character of "Anthony Blanche" in Waugh's novel Brideshead Revisited (1945). In a letter to Lord Baldwin, Waugh wrote, "There is an aesthetic bugger who sometimes turns up in my novels under various names – that was 2/3 Brian [Howard] and 1/3 Harold Acton. People think it was all Harold, who is a much sweeter and saner man [than Howard]." Waugh also wrote, "The characters in my novels often wrongly identified with Harold Acton were to a great extent drawn from Brian Howard".

=== General strike and after ===
In 1926 Acton acted as a special constable during the general strike, apolitical as he was, and took his degree. In October he took an apartment in Paris, at 29 Quai de Bourbon, and had his portrait painted by Pavel Tchelitchew. Moving between Paris and London in the next few years, Acton sought to find his voice as a writer. In 1927 he began work on a novel, and a third book of poems, Five Saints and an Appendix, came out early the following year. This was followed by a prose fable, Cornelian, in March. In July Acton acted as best man at the wedding of Evelyn Waugh to the Honourable Evelyn Gardner. Waugh's Decline and Fall bore a dedication to Acton 'in Homage and Affection', but when Acton's own novel – disastrously entitled Humdrum – appeared in October 1928, it was slated in comparison with Decline and Fall by critics such as Cyril Connolly.

In the later 1920s, Harold frequented the London salon of Lady Cunard, where at various times he encountered Ezra Pound, Joseph Duveen and the Irish novelist George Moore. On visits to Florence he cemented his friendship with Norman Douglas, who wrote an introduction to Acton's translation of a lubricious 18th-century memoir of Giangastone de' Medici, The Last of the Medici, privately printed in Florence in 1930 as part of the Lungarno Series. A fourth collection of poems, This Chaos, was published in Paris by Acton's friend Nancy Cunard, though the Giangastone translation pointed in a more promising direction. History was indeed to prove far more congenial to Acton than poetry. His The Last Medici (not to be confused with the earlier book of similar title) was published by Faber in 1932, the first of a series of distinguished contributions to Italian historical studies.

One close observer, Alan Pryce-Jones, felt that life in Florence weighed upon Acton with its triviality, for, like his father, he was a hard worker and a careful scholar. The East was an escape. He took up residence in Beiping, as Beijing was then known, which he found congenial. He studied Chinese language, traditional drama, and poetry. Between his arrival in 1932 and 1939 he published respected translations of Peach Blossom Fan and Modern Chinese Poetry (1936), both in collaboration with Ch'en Shih-hsiang, and Famous Chinese Plays (1937) in collaboration with L.C. Arlington. His novel Peonies and Ponies (1941) is a sharp portrait of expatriate life. He translated Glue and Lacquer (1941), selected from the 17th-century writer Feng Menglong's Tales to Rouse the World, with a preface by Arthur Waley, the leading scholar-translator and member of the Bloomsbury Group.

The Second Sino-Japanese War broke out in 1937, but Acton did not leave until 1939, when he returned to England and joined the Royal Air Force as a liaison officer. He served in India and what was then Ceylon; and then, after the Liberation, in Paris. When the war was over, he returned to Florence. La Pietra had been occupied by German soldiers, but he expeditiously restored it to its former glory.

== Literary works ==
Acton's non-historical works include four volumes of poetry, three novels, two novellas, two volumes of short stories, two volumes of autobiography and a memoir of his friend Nancy Mitford, who was his exact contemporary. His historical works include The Last Medici, a study of the later Medici Grand Dukes, and two large volumes on the House of Bourbon, rulers of the Kingdom of Naples in the 18th and earlier 19th century, which together may be said to constitute his magnum opus.

== Awards and honours ==
Acton was made a Commander of the Order of the British Empire (CBE) in 1965 and knighted in 1974. The British Institute in Florence, an important centre for Anglo-Florentine cultural life since 1917, renamed its collections the Harold Acton Library.

== Personal life ==
Acton was Catholic; his cultural and historical commitment to the Church remained unchanged throughout his life. Acton's name was first on a petition submitted to Rome in 1971 by members of the British cultural élite, requesting that the traditional Latin rite of the Mass not be abrogated in England. His mother, the heiress Hortense Lenore Mitchell, a dominating personality in his life who lived on until the age of 90, did not make life easy for him but he still remained the devoted and admiring son.

Acton was a prominent member of the Bright Young Things in 1920s London.

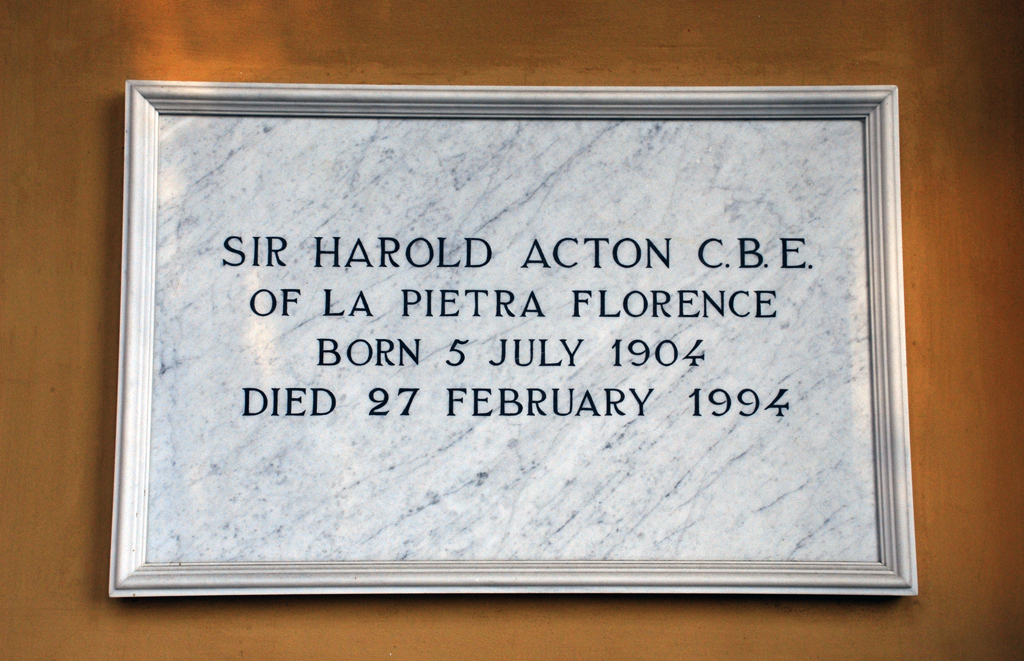
Cimitero Evangelico Agli Allori

After Acton's death, in reply to a magazine article that speculated both about the probable suicide of Acton's brother and about Acton's homosexuality, author A. N. Wilson remarked, "To call him homosexual would be to misunderstand the whole essence of his being" and that "He was more asexual than anything else". The article, by American writer David Plante, described Acton at Oxford as a "virile aesthete-dandy," but noted that while in China during the 1930s Acton's predilection for boys led to a classified government document describing him as a "scandalous debauchee," and prevented the possibility of his serving in the intelligence services there, when war broke out. Plante also described the young men whom Acton welcomed to La Pietra, including Alexander Zielcke, a German photographer and artist who was Acton's lover for the last twenty-five years of his life.

When Acton died he left Villa La Pietra to New York University. In leaving his family's property and collection to New York University, Acton expressed his desire that the estate be used as a meeting place for students, faculty, and guests who might study, teach, write and do research, and as a centre for international programs. Following his death, DNA testing confirmed the existence of a half-sister born out of wedlock, whose heirs have gone to court to challenge Acton's $500 million bequest to New York University.

Acton was buried beside his parents and brother in the Catholic section of the Cimitero Evangelico degli Allori in the southern suburb of Florence, Galluzzo (Italy).

== Publications ==
- Aquarium, London, Duckworth, 1923
- An Indian Ass, London, Duckworth, 1925.
- Five Saints and an Appendix, London, Holden, 1927.
- Cornelian, London, The Westminster Press, 1928.
- Humdrum, London, The Westminster Press, 1928.
- The Last of the Medici, Florence, G. Orioli, 1930.
- This Chaos, Paris, Hours Press, 1930.
- The Last Medici, London, Faber & Faber, 1932.
- Modern Chinese Poetry (with Ch'en Shih-Hsiang), Duckworth, 1936.
- Famous Chinese Plays (with L. C. Arlington), Peiping, Henri Vetch, 1937.
- Glue and Lacquer: Four Cautionary Tales (with Lee Yi-Hsieh), London, The Golden Cockerel Press, 1941.
- Peonies and Ponies, London, Chatto & Windus, 1941; rpr. Hong Kong; New York: Oxford University Press, 1983.
- Memoirs of an Aesthete, London, Methuen, 1948; reprinted London, Methuen, 1970.
- Prince Isidore: A Novel, London, Methuen, 1950.
- The Bourbons of Naples (1734–1825), London, Methuen, 1956.
- Ferdinando Galiani, Rome, Edizioni di Storia e di Letteratura, 1960.
- Florence (with Martin Huerlimann), London, Thames & Hudson, 1960.
- The Last Bourbons of Naples (1825–1861), London, Methuen, 1961.
- Old Lamps for New, London, Methuen, 1965.
- More Memoirs of an Aesthete, London, Methuen, 1970.
- Tit for Tat, London, Hamish Hamilton, 1972.
- Tuscan Villas, London, Thames & Hudson, 1973; reprinted as The Villas of Tuscany, London, Thames & Hudson, 1984.
- Nancy Mitford: A Memoir, London, Hamish Hamilton, 1975.
- The Peach Blossom Fan (with Ch'en Shih-Hsiang), Berkeley, University of California Press, 1976.
- The Pazzi Conspiracy: The Plot Against the Medici, London, Thames & Hudson, 1979.
- The Soul's Gymnasium, London, Hamish Hamilton, 1982.
- Three Extraordinary Ambassadors, London, Thames & Hudson, 1984.
- Florence: A Travellers' Companion (introduction; texts ed. Edward Chaney), London, Constable, 1986.
