= Brian Howard (poet) =

English poet

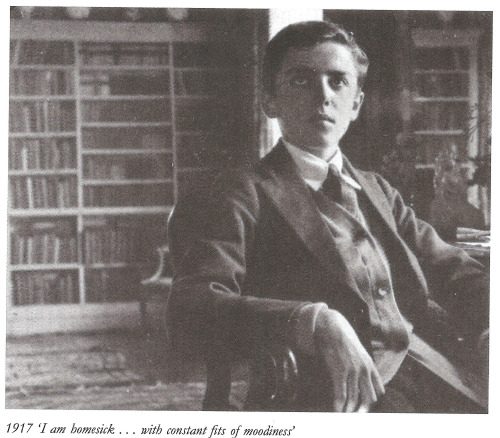
- Howard in 1917
- Born: 13 March 1905; Hascombe, Surrey, England
- Died: 15 January 1958 (aged 52); Nice, France
- Resting place: Cimetière Caucade, Nice, France
- Education: Eton College

Brian Christian de Claiborne Howard (13 March 1905 – 15 January 1958) was an English poet and later a writer for the New Statesman.

== Biography ==
Howard was born in Hascombe, Surrey, to American parents of Protestant descent. He was a descendant of Benjamin Franklin, and brought up in London. His father, Francis Howard Gassaway, was the son of the writer Frank Gassaway, and was an associate of James Whistler. His great grandfather, Stephen Griffith Gassaway, was Episcopal rector of Christ Church, Georgetown, D.C. His great-grandfather, John Wesley Chess, was married by a Methodist minister, and his great-grandfather, Rufus Washburn Carley, was a minister in the Methodist Episcopal Church.

He was educated at Eton College, where he was one of the Eton Arts Society group including Robert Byron, Harold Acton, Oliver Messel, Anthony Powell and Henry Yorke. He entered Christ Church, Oxford in 1923. He was prominent in the group later known as the Oxford Wits. He was part of the Hypocrites' Club that included Harold Acton, Lord David Cecil, L. P. Hartley and Evelyn Waugh.

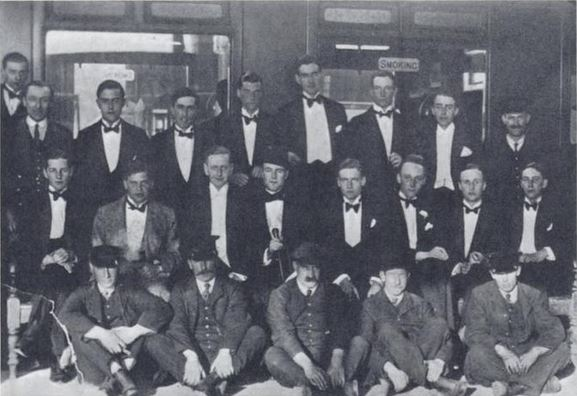
Railway Club at Oxford, conceived by John Sutro, dominated by Harold Acton. Left to right, back: Henry Yorke, Roy Harrod, Henry Weymouth, David Plunket Greene, Harry Stavordale, Brian Howard. Middle row: Michael Rosse, John Sutro, Hugh Lygon, Harold Acton, Bryan Guinness, Patrick Balfour, Mark Ogilvie-Grant, Johnny Drury-Lowe; front: porters.

At Oxford, Howard was part of the Railway Club, which included: Henry Yorke, Roy Harrod, Henry Thynne, 6th Marquess of Bath, David Plunket Greene, Harry Fox-Strangways, 7th Earl of Ilchester, Michael Parsons, 6th Earl of Rosse, John Sutro, Hugh Lygon, Harold Acton, Bryan Guinness, 2nd Baron Moyne, Patrick Balfour, 3rd Baron Kinross, Mark Ogilvie-Grant, and John Drury-Lowe.

It has been suggested that Howard was Waugh's model for Anthony Blanche in Brideshead Revisited. But Waugh wrote, to Lord Baldwin, "There is an aesthetic bugger who sometimes turns up in my novels under various names—that was 2/3 Brian [Howard] and 1/3 Harold Acton. People think it was all Harold, who is a much sweeter and saner man [than Howard]."

At this time he had already been published as a poet, in A. R. Orage's The New Age, and the final Sitwell Wheels anthology. He used the pseudonyms "Jasper Proude" and "Charles Orange." His verse also was in Oxford Poetry 1924. His poetry was admired and promoted by Edith Sitwell in the late 1920s.

In the late 1920s, he was a key figure among London's "Bright Young Things"—a privileged, fashionable and bohemian set of relentless party-goers, satirised in such novels as Evelyn Waugh's 1930 Vile Bodies where the character of Miles Malpractice owes something to Howard. Apart from Waugh, Howard knew this circle, including Nancy Mitford, Henry Yorke, Harold Acton, and especially Allanah Harper and Nancy Cunard. He maintained contact with both throughout his life.

In 1929, he was famously involved in the "Bruno Hat" hoax when the fashionable Hon Mr. & Mrs. Bryan Guinness promoted a spoof London art exhibition by an apparently unknown German painter Bruno Hat (impersonated by the German-speaking Tom Mitford, brother of Nancy and Diana Mitford—the latter at the time Mrs. Guinness, a socialite, arts' patron and friend of Howard, Lytton Strachey, Evelyn Waugh, Boris Anrep, Dora Carrington, John Betjeman and other artistic and literary figures—before her second marriage to British fascist leader Sir Oswald Mosley). Bruno Hat's paintings were the work of Brian Howard.

Howard is credited with coining the phrase, "Anybody over the age of 30 seen in a bus has been a failure in life", often wrongly attributed to Margaret Thatcher. According to Daily Telegraph correspondent and historian, Hugo Vickers, (writing in November 2006), the author was Brian Howard. The phrase came into wider use when used by Loelia, Duchess of Westminster, in her memoir Grace and Favour (1961).

Subsequently, he led a very active social life, tried to come to terms with his homosexuality, and published only one substantial poetry collection God Save the King (1930, Hours Press). He was active as a poet during the Spanish Civil War, but did not ultimately invest in his work with seriousness. He drank heavily and used drugs.

He had a long affair with Sandy (Alexander William Bertie Gordon) Baird, whom he knew from Eton.

During World War II, Howard took part in the Dunkirk evacuation and later worked for MI5 but was dismissed from the War Office in June 1942, after which he was conscripted to the Royal Air Force and given a low-level clerk's job at Bomber Command, High Wycombe. Transferred to another posting, where he referred to his commanding officer as "Colonel Cutie" (an appellation Evelyn Waugh gave his rebellious rogue Basil Seal in the novel Put Out More Flags), Howard was dismissed in December 1944, by which time he had formed a longstanding open relationship with Sam Langford, an Irishman serving in the Air Sea Rescue.

After the war, Howard drifted around Europe with Sam, continuing to write occasional articles and reviews for the New Statesman, the BBC and others, fitfully working on an uncompleted biography of the gay English writer Norman Douglas (author of the novel South Wind) and doing no substantial work. Because of drinking, drug use, and sexual indiscretions, they were expelled in turn from Monaco, France, Italy and Spain, the French authorities noting their "moralité douteuse" (dubious morality).

He suffered from bad health in the 1950s, and committed suicide by taking an overdose of barbiturates after the death of his lover, Sam Langford (1926–1958), who died suddenly but naturally in Howard's bath. They were buried alongside each other at Russian Orthodox Cemetery, Nice.

Evelyn Waugh wrote: "I used to know Brian Howard well—a dazzling young man to my innocent eyes. In later life he became very dangerous—constantly attacking people with his fists in public places—so I kept clear of him. He was consumptive but the immediate cause of his death was a broken heart."

Marie-Jaqueline Lancaster wrote a biography of Howard. His long time friend Allanah Harper contributed useful anecdotes, but she objected to his being called a "failure" and to the emphasis on his homosexuality.

== See also ==
- Bright young things
