= John Davies Knatchbull Lloyd =

John Davies Knatchbull Lloyd OBE (28 April 1900 – 13 December 1978), generally known as J. D. K. Lloyd or The Widow Lloyd, was an antiquarian researcher, public servant and notable figure in the memoirs of many of the notable figures of the twentieth century, including Evelyn Waugh and Anthony Powell.

== Early life and education ==
Lloyd was born on 28 April 1900, in Kensington, London, the elder son of John Maurice Edward Lloyd (1844-1910), M.A., a barrister of Lincoln's Inn, and Alice Norton (d. 1906), daughter of Major-General Charles Stirling Dundas, son of the 26th Chief of Clan Dundas. Her mother, Mary Louisa, was daughter of Sir Norton Joseph Knatchbull, 10th Baronet. The Lloyd family had lived in the town of Montgomery for centuries, descending from Maurice Lloyd, Capital Bailiff of Montgomery in 1686. Lloyd's younger brother, Wyndham Edward Buckley Lloyd (1901-1980), F.R.C.S., L.R.C.P., was a physician and writer on medical history.

Lloyd was educated at Winchester School and Trinity College, Oxford (M.A.), and was the founder of the Hypocrites' Club, which included among its members Evelyn Waugh, Anthony Powell who dedicated a book to him, Robert Byron and many other prominent figures of the time.

== Career ==
He received the nickname 'the Widow' in reference to a shaving lotion, 'The Widow Lloyd's Euxesis'. Lloyd's name appears in conjunction with this nickname in the journals and letters of many of his contemporaries for decades afterward. Lloyd spent his life devoted to antiquarian research and in public service to his community.

=== Public service career ===
- 1929-1946: Secretary of the council for the preservation of rural Wales.
- 1934: Justice of the Peace
- 1937-1967: Secretary of the Powysland Club.
- 1940: High Sheriff of Montgomeryshire
- 1948-1951: Chairman of the Montgomeryshire Health Executive Council
- 1953-1955: Chairman of Montgomeryshire Planning Committee
- 1954: President of the Cambrian Archaeological Association
- 1956-1969: editor of Archaeologia Cambrensis
- 1957-1974: Chairman of the Montgomeryshire County library Committee
- 1957: Awarded OBE
- 1960: Deputy Lieutenant of the county of Powys
- 1967-1974: A Commissioner on the Royal Commission on the Ancient and Historical Monuments in Wales
- 1969: Honorary LLD from the University of Wales
- Mayor of Montgomery: 1932-1938 and 1961–1962
- Member of the Historic Buildings Council for Wales
- Fellow of the Society of Antiquaries

J. D. K. Lloyd wrote many articles and guides to Montgomery. He donated Dolforwyn Castle to the Welsh Ancient Monument Board (now Cadw) in 1955.

On the death of his uncle William Llewellyn Lloyd in 1925, Lloyd took over as head of the family, which appeared in Burke's Landed Gentry as "of Plas Trefaldwyn" and later "formerly of Castell Forwyn", the latter reflecting Lloyd's sale of that house in 1948 (retaining the estate) to live at Bryn Cadwrfa.

Lloyd died on 13 December 1978 at his home Bronhafren, Garthmyl.
