= Gilfachrheda =

Village in Ceredigion, Wales

Coordinates: 52.204170°N 4.327249°W

Gilfachreda
- Location within Ceredigion
- OS grid reference: SN 4106 5877
  - Cardiff: 70.1 mi (112.8 km)
  - London: 185.5 mi (298.5 km)
- Community: Llanarth
- Principal area: Ceredigion
- Country: Wales
- Sovereign state: United Kingdom
- Post town: Ceinewydd
- Postcode district: SA45
- Police: Dyfed-Powys
- Fire: Mid and West Wales
- Ambulance: Welsh
- UK Parliament: Ceredigion Preseli
- Senedd Cymru – Welsh Parliament: Ceredigion

Gilfachrheda or Gilfachreda is a village in the community of Llanarth, Ceredigion, Wales, at the confluence of two small rivers, the Afon Gido and the Afon Llethy. Gilfachrheda is on the B4342 road, about 1.25 miles (2 km) east of New Quay and 1 mile (1.6 km) northwest of the village of Llanarth.

== Notable resident ==
From 1937 until 1958, Alastair Hugh Graham (1904–1982) lived as a recluse at Plas-y-Wern Lodge, Gilfachrheda.
