= Allanah Harper =

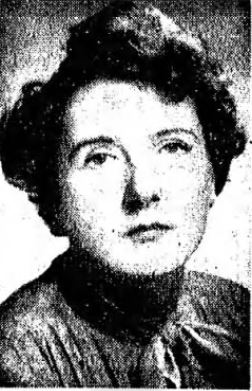
- Born: 6 November 1904; Brighton, Sussex, England
- Died: 3 November 1992 (aged 87)
- Occupation: Author

Allanah Harper (6 November 1904 – 3 November 1992) was an English writer. She is best known for founding the journal Echanges (Exchanges), and for her 1948 autobiography.

== Biography ==
Harper came from a successful family and travelled extensively owing to her father's career as an engineering contractor. She moved to France as a young adult, founding the journal Echanges, which attempted to give British and French writers an audience for each other's work. She introduced writers such as W. H. Auden, T. S. Eliot and Virginia Woolf to the French. She made funds available to Sybille Bedford over a period of 3 years to enable her to write her first book. Harper married Robert Statlender at the start of World War II. The couple moved to America before splitting. Afterwards she moved back to France. She remained there for the rest of her life, though she visited London frequently. She was friends with the poet Brian Howard. Harper later contributed useful anecdotes for Marie-Jaqueline Lancaster's biography of Brian Howard. However, Harper objected to him being called a "failure" and to Lancaster's emphasis on his homosexuality which she considered to be an "illness" and something that should not be drawn attention to.

Harper published an autobiography in 1948. Her work has been archived at the Harry Ransom Center in the University of Texas at Austin.

Harper died three days before her 88th birthday on 3 November 1992.

== Work ==
In 1948 she published a book of memories from her childhood entitled All Trivial Fond Records, named for a quote from Hamlet and in 1976 co-edited an anthology of Dame Edith Sitwell's work entitled Fire of the Mind.

The Des Moines Register wrote that her autobiographical, All Trivial Fond Records, "may well be the most charming book of the year." The Chicago Tribune wrote that "Miss Harper's account of her Edwardian childhood and Georgian youth is one of the most delightful we have read in a long time."

A New York Times reviewer, Michiko Kakutani, found fault with her editing on Edith Sitwell: Fire of the Mind.
