= John Sutro =

British film producer (1903–1985)

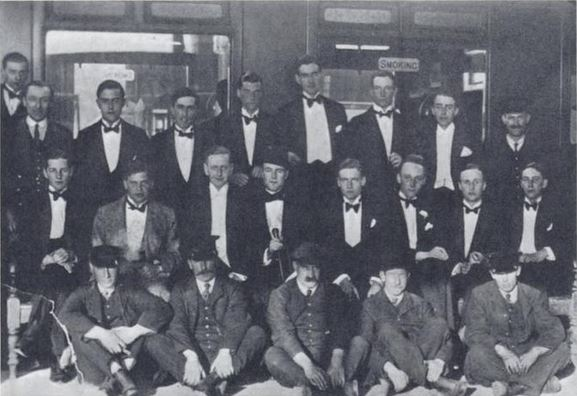
- Railway Club at Oxford. Left to right, back: Henry Yorke, Roy Harrod, Henry Weymouth, David Plunket Greene, Harry Stavordale, Brian Howard. Middle row: Michael Rosse, John Sutro, Hugh Lygon, Harold Acton, Bryan Guinness, Patrick Balfour, Mark Ogilvie-Grant, Johnny Drury-Lowe; front: porters.
- Born: 23 April 1903; London, England
- Died: 18 June 1985 (aged 82); Monte Carlo, Monaco
- Occupation: Film producer
- Years active: 1925–1967

John Sutro (23 April 1903 – 18 June 1985) was a British film producer. He produced seven films between 1941 and 1951. He was a member of the jury at the 7th Berlin International Film Festival.

== Education ==
At Oxford Sutro conceived the Railway Club, which was dominated by Harold Acton. The other members included: Henry Yorke, Roy Harrod, Henry Thynne, 6th Marquess of Bath, David Plunket Greene, Edward Henry Charles James Fox-Strangways, 7th Earl of Ilchester, Brian Howard, Michael Parsons, 6th Earl of Rosse, Hugh Lygon, Bryan Guinness, 2nd Baron Moyne, Patrick Balfour, 3rd Baron Kinross, Mark Ogilvie-Grant, John Drury-Lowe and Evelyn Waugh.

== Personal life ==
He was a close friend of the Mitford sisters and was a regular part of the group of artists and intellectuals with whom they regularly associated in the 1920s and 1930s. Sutro was Jewish.

== Filmography ==
- 49th Parallel (1941)
- The Way Ahead (1944)
- Men of Two Worlds (1946)
- Carnival (1946)
- Children of Chance (1949)
- Her Favourite Husband (1950)
- Honeymoon Deferred (1951)
- Cheer the Brave (1951)
