= The Life of John Maynard Keynes =

1951 biography by Roy F. Harrod

- First edition (UK)
- Author: Roy Harrod
- Language: English
- Subject: Biography and Economics
- Publisher: Macmillan, W.W. Norton & Company, Inc. (paperback)
- Publication date: 1951; 1983
- Publication place: United States
- Media type: Print
- Pages: 708
- ISBN: 978-0-393-30024-6 (paperback)
- OCLC: 1193681

The Life of John Maynard Keynes is a non-fiction work by Roy Harrod, about the life of John Maynard Keynes. It was first published in 1951. A paperback edition was published in 1983. According to the preface of the book, Harrod was solicited by Keynes's younger brother, the scholar Geoffrey Keynes, to write the biography and thus had full access to Keynes' personal papers and his family.
