= Alastair Hugh Graham =

Gay man in Wales

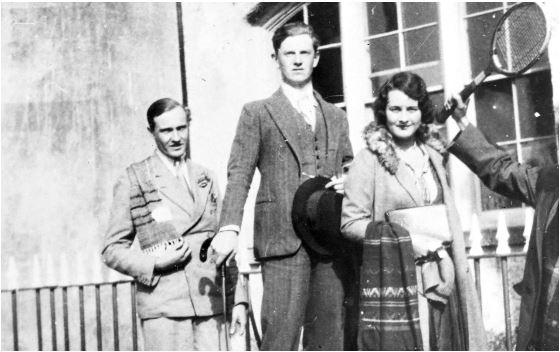
- Evelyn Waugh, centre, with Alastair Graham and Elizabeth Harman (the future Lady Longford) in 1930
- Born: 27 June 1904; United Kingdom
- Died: 6 October 1982 (aged 78); Machynlleth, Wales
- Education: Brasenose College, Oxford

Alastair Hugh Graham (27 June 1904 – 6 October 1982) was an honorary attaché in Athens and Cairo, an Oxford friend of Evelyn Waugh, and, according to Waugh's letters, one of his "romances". He is the inspiration for Sebastian Flyte in Brideshead Revisited. While Hugh Lygon and Stephen Tennant were considered to have inspired the character, Sebastian’s mannerisms and letters echo those of young Graham. Waugh wrote privately that the character had been based on Graham and his son, Auberon Waugh, confirmed it after his father’s death.

== Biography ==
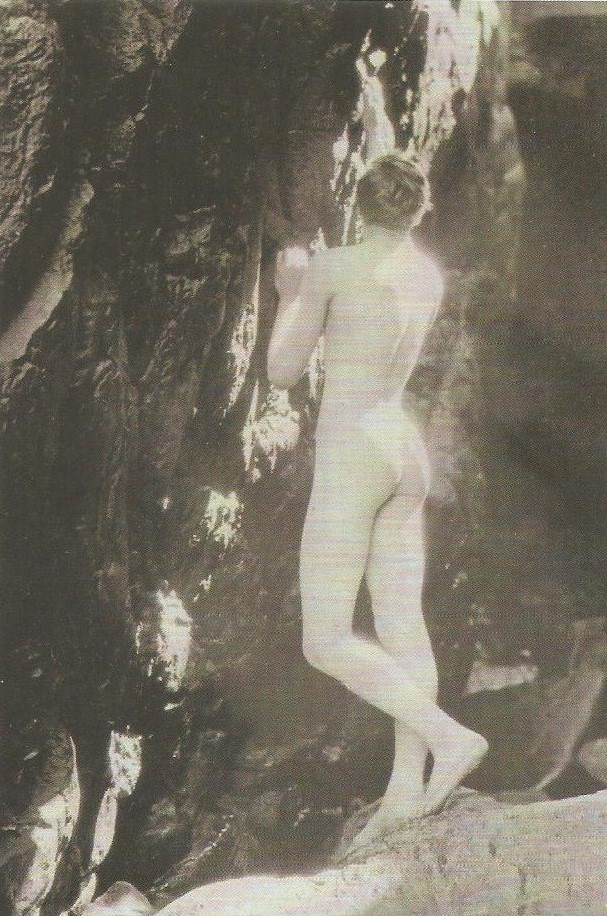
Come and drink with me somewhere: photograph sent by Graham to Evelyn Waugh

Alastair Hugh Graham was born on 27 June 1904 to Hugh Graham (1860-1921), of Barford House, Barford, Warwickshire, and Jessie, daughter of Andrew Low, of Savannah, Georgia. His father was the younger son of Sir Frederick Ulric Graham, 3rd Baronet (1820–1888), of the Graham Baronets of Netherby in Cumberland, and Lady Jane Hermione Seymour (1832–1909), daughter of Edward Seymour, 12th Duke of Somerset. Jessie Graham, a cotton heiress, would later appear as Lady Circumference in Decline and Fall and as Mrs. Kent-Cumberland in Winner Takes All both by Evelyn Waugh.

Graham attended a day school in Leamington Spa and was at Wellington College, Berkshire for a very short time, leaving at fifteen. He subsequently studied at Brasenose College, Oxford University,

At Oxford, he met Evelyn Waugh around Christmas 1923 or slightly before. There, Graham was part of the Hypocrites' Club with Waugh. Graham sent Waugh a nude photo of himself near a waterfall, asking Waugh to "Come and drink with me somewhere" at the height of their romance along with a letter. Waugh kept these in an envelope labelled ‘Sentimental Friendships’ until his death.

The Graham family's early 19th-century country house, Barford House, Barford, Warwickshire, between Warwick and Stratford-upon Avon, was where Alastair entertained Waugh as a guest. Graham was Waugh's closest friend from 1924 to 1929.

In Brideshead Revisited, Waugh has Charles Ryder revisiting Brideshead Castle, and remembering "I had been there before, first with Sebastian more than twenty years ago on a cloudless day in June...". According to Philip Eade and others, Waugh is here remembering his own love affair with Graham, started at Barford House in 1923 when Graham was 19.

In his memoirs, Waugh stated that Graham was the inspiration of Lord Sebastian Flyte even more than Hugh Lygon. In the manuscript of Brideshead Revisited, the name "Alastair" sometimes occurs instead of "Sebastian". In Waugh's autobiography, A Little Learning... an autobiography (1964), Graham appears under the name of Hamish Lennox, and Waugh said of him he was "the friend of my heart".

When Waugh left Oxford one term short of the degree requirements in August 1924, he went to live with Graham in a caravan in a field near Beckley, and from there they went on holiday to Ireland. It was after this trip that Graham converted to Roman Catholicism (September 1924). When Graham went to visit his sister and her husband in Kenya in mid-September 1924, the friendship between Graham and Waugh took a step back, but in August 1926, Graham, his mother and Waugh went to Scotland; and on their return, Graham and Waugh went to France together with Richard Plunket Greene. Around this time, Graham, who owned a small printing press and was then apprenticed at the Shakespeare Head Press, printed Waugh's essay P.R.B.: An Essay on the Pre-Raphaelite Brotherhood 1847–54.

Graham was an honorary attaché in Athens between 1927 and 1929, where Waugh visited him for the Christmas holidays. Graham wrote to his friend Claud Cockburn on a number of occasions during this time. In Greece, Graham lived with another attaché, Mark Ogilvie-Grant. In 1929, both were transferred to Cairo with Vivian Cornelius until 1933. During World War II, Graham participated in the Dunkirk evacuation, joined the Royal Observer Corps and was a liaison officer with the US Navy.

From 1937 he lived privately – because of his homosexuality (though one source close to him believed it was as a result of an affair concerning jewellery) – on the Welsh coast, at Plas-y-Wern Lodge, Gilfachrheda, moving subsequently to a house in nearby New Quay itself. He bought a yacht called The Osprey and was a member of the New Quay Yacht Club, as well as president of the New Quay branch of the RNLI. He was on familiar terms with Dylan Thomas, another New Quay resident, and appeared as a prosecution witness when Captain Richard Killick was accused of attempting to murder Thomas. Graham is thought to have been the original of Lord Cut-Glass in Thomas' play Under Milk Wood. He died in Machynlleth Hospital in October 1982 from cancer of the pancreas.
