= Derrick Dodd =

Frank Harrison Gassaway was a noted American humorist and poet who often wrote under the pseudonym Derrick Dodd. Dodd is perhaps most well known for his travel letters Summer Saunterings published under this pseudonym. Although little is known of his personal life before he became a prominent writer in California, save that he was of a Virginian family, Dodd apparently married a southern belle from Washington, D.C., named Elizabeth Paschal and fathered a son, Francis, in 1874 or 1875. Dodd's grandson was the writer Brian Howard. In 1880, Dodd left Washington, D.C., and moved to Oakland, California where he began writing for major San Francisco papers including the San Francisco Examiner, Chronicle and the Evening Post. By 1892, Dodd had become the business manager for William Randolph Hearst's paper the San Francisco Examiner and a great admirer of the leading newspaper mogul. A volume of his poems entitled Poems was published in 1920 and was dedicated to Hearst.

== Writing career ==
Dodd contributed a humorous column to the Evening Post and gained notoriety for his Mark Twain-like style and wit. Some of his writings from this column were compiled in 1882 as the volume Summer Saunterings. This collection of short travel narratives comments on popular hotels, landmarks and transportation routes in various California cities such as Santa Barbara, Monterey, Napa and San Jose. In his later work, Dodd adopted a more serious and sentimental style, mainly writing poetry dealing with the Civil War. His most renowned poem, "The Pride of Battery B" was originally published in the San Francisco Examiner. This poem, about an orphan girl who temporarily reconciles the two sides during the bloody battle of Antietam, was critically acclaimed and became a popular piece for recitations. A compilation of Dodd's poetry was published as the volume Poems in 1920.
