= Richard Pares =

British historian (1902–1958)

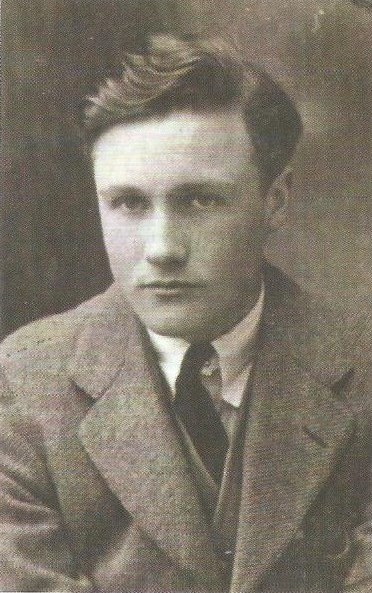
Richard Pares in the 1920s

Richard Pares CBE FBA (25 August 1902 – 3 May 1958) was a British historian. He "was considered to be among the outstanding British historians of his time." He has been cited as being the first gay lover of Evelyn Waugh.

== Family life and education ==
The eldest son of the five children of the historian Bernard Pares (1867–1949) and his wife Margaret Ellis, Richard Pares won scholarships at Winchester College and at Balliol College, Oxford, where he took a first-class degree in literae humaniores in 1924. On obtaining his Oxford degree, he was elected to a fellowship of All Souls College, Oxford, which he retained until 1945. In 1937, he married Janet Lindsay Powicke, daughter of the historian F. Maurice Powicke, and had four daughters.

== Academic career ==
In 1927–28, he was appointed assistant lecturer in history at University College London, before obtaining a Laura Spelman Rockefeller Scholarship to do research in the United States and in the West Indies on mid-eighteenth-century trade. On his return to England, he was appointed lecturer in history at New College, Oxford. In 1940, World War II interrupted his Oxford academic career and he became an administrative civil servant at the Board of Trade. On returning to his academic career in 1945 as professor of history at the University of Edinburgh, he was appointed Commander of the Most Excellent Order of the British Empire in recognition of his wartime public service. He remained at Edinburgh until he resigned for reasons of health in 1954. In 1951, he was Ford's Lecturer in Oxford and he was joint editor of the English Historical Review from 1939 to 1958. He was elected a fellow of the British Academy in 1948.

== Published books and pamphlets ==
- "Public records in British West India islands", reprinted from Bulletin of the Institute of Historical Research vol. 7 (1930), pp. 149–157
- War and Trade in the West Indies, 1739–1763 (1936, 1963)
- "The economic factors in the history of the Empire," Reprinted from: Economic history review, vol. 7, no. 2 (May 1937), pp. 119–144.
- "The manning of the navy in the West Indies, 1702–63" Offprint from: Transactions of the Royal Historical Society, 4th ser., v. 20, 1937, pp. 31–60.
- "Prisoners of war in the West Indies in the 18th century" Reprinted from Journal of the Barbados museum and historical society (1937).
- Colonial Blockade and Neutral Rights, 1739–1763 (1938, 1975).
- A West-India Fortune (1950, 1968).
- King George III and the Politicians: the Ford lectures delivered in the University of Oxford, 1951–52 (1953)
- Yankees and Creoles: the trade between North America and the West Indies before the American Revolution (1956)
- Essays Presented to Sir Lewis Namier, edited by Richard Pares and A. J. P. Taylor (1956, 1971).
- Limited Monarchy in Great Britain in the Eighteenth Century (1957, 1967)
- "Merchants and planters," Economic History Review. Supplement 4 (1960)
- The Historian's Business, and other essays, edited by R. A. and Elisabeth Humphreys; with an introduction by Lucy Sutherland (1960).
