= Robert Byron (travel writer) =

British writer (1905–1941)

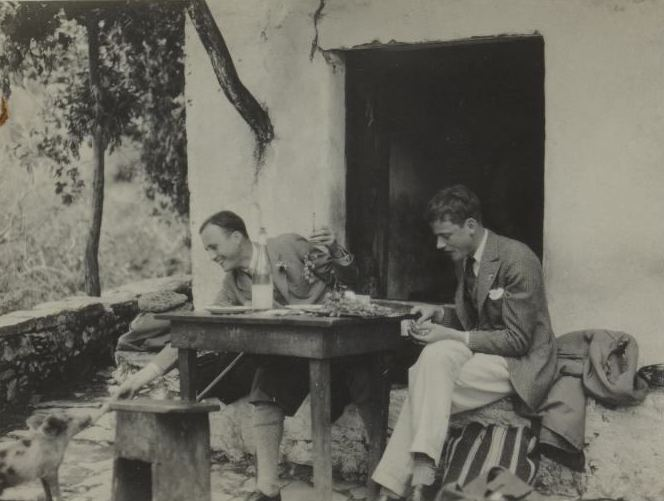
- Byron and Desmond Parsons in China sometime before 1937
- Born: 26 February 1905; Wembley, Middlesex
- Died: 24 February 1941 (aged 35) off Cape Wrath, Scotland
- Occupations: Author, historian, art critic
- Writing career
- Period: 1928–37
- Genres: History, travel, non-fiction,
- Subjects: Greece, India, Middle East, Tibet, Persia, Afghanistan

Robert Byron (26 February 1905 – 24 February 1941) was an English travel writer, best known for his travelogue The Road to Oxiana. He was also an art critic and historian.

== Biography ==
Robert Byron was born in Wembley, London on 26 February 1905, the only son of three children born to Eric Byron, a civil engineer, and his wife Margaret, daughter of William Robinson, of Southall Manor, Middlesex. He was educated at Eton College and Merton College, Oxford, where he graduated in 1925 in Modern History. At Oxford he took part in the Hypocrites' Club.

Byron travelled in 1925 across Europe in a car to Greece, with Alfred Duggan and Gavin Henderson. It led to his first book, and a second was commissioned for Duckworth by Thomas Balston, to be on Mount Athos. He later visited India, the Soviet Union, and Tibet.

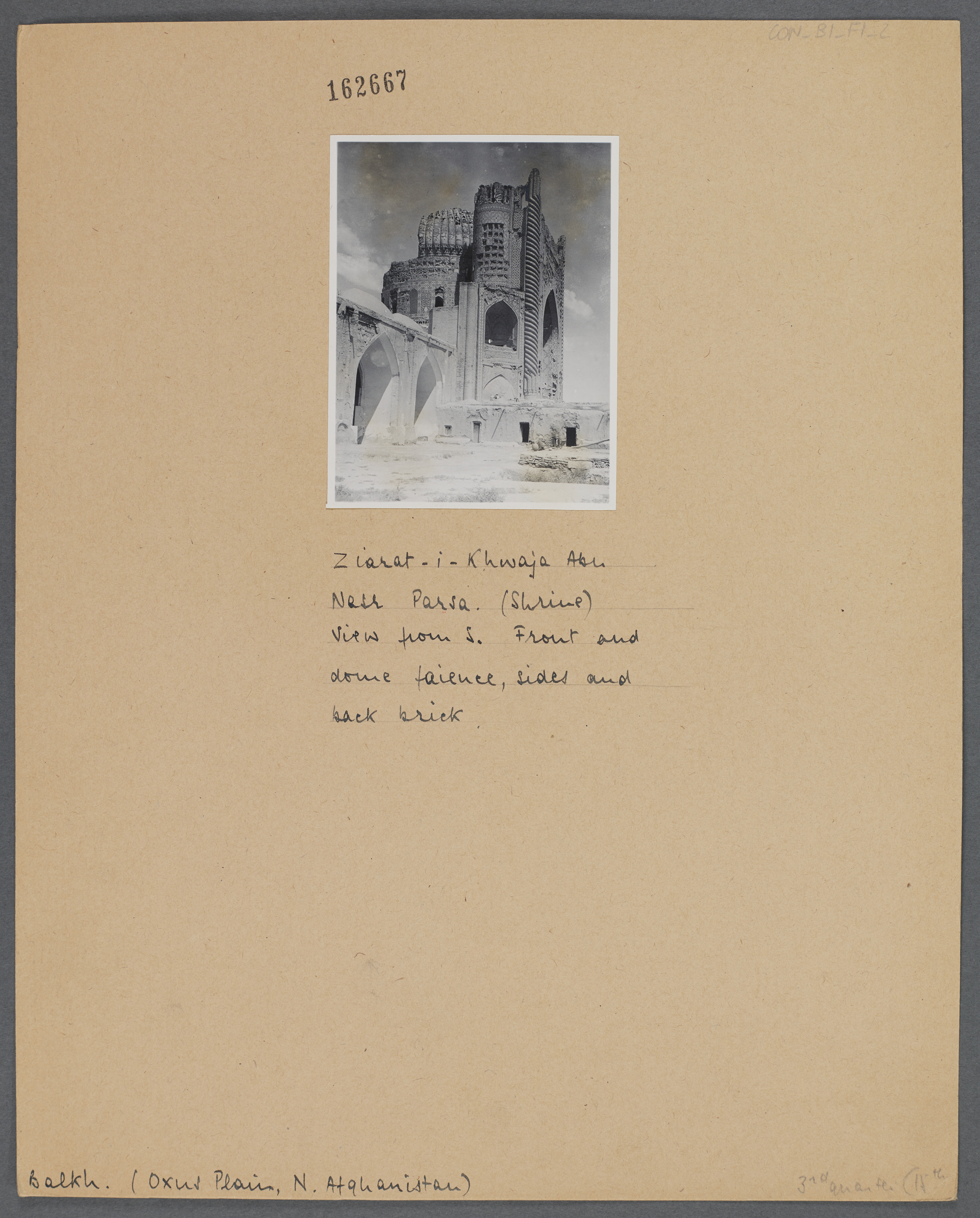
Shrine of Khwaja Abu Nasr Parsa, photographed by Robert Byron. Photograph held in The Courtauld Conway Library of Art and architecture.

It was in Persia and Afghanistan that Byron found the subject to match his style of travel writing. He completed his account of The Road to Oxiana in Beijing, his temporary home. His innovation, that set him apart from his major travel writing rival Peter Fleming and others, was to disregard the conventional continuous narrative.

An appreciation of architecture is a strong element in Byron's writings. He was a forceful advocate for the preservation of historic buildings and a founder member of the Georgian Group. A philhellene, he also pioneered, in the English-speaking world, a renewal of interest in Byzantine history. Byron has been described as "one of the first and most brilliant of twentieth-century philhellenes". Photographs of Iranian architecture by Byron, taken while he was writing The Road to Oxiana between 1933 and 1934 are held in the Conway Library of Art and Architecture at The Courtauld Institute of Art in London.

He attended the last Nuremberg Rally, in 1938, with Nazi sympathiser Unity Mitford. Byron knew her through his friendship with her sister Nancy Mitford, but he was an outspoken opponent of the Nazis. Nancy Mitford hoped at one stage that Byron would propose marriage to her, and was later astonished as well as shocked to discover his homosexual tastes, complaining: "This wretched paederasty falsifies all feelings and yet one is supposed to revere it." According to Paul Fussell in his introduction to the Oxford paperback edition of The Road to Oxiana (1982) Byron was a fervent and vocal critic of Hitler, "object[ing] in the most violent terms to the Nazification of Europe and abusing those in England who imagined that some sort of compromise with this new wickedness was possible".

Byron's great, though unreciprocated, passion was for Desmond Parsons, younger brother of the 6th Earl of Rosse, who was regarded as one of the most charismatic men of his generation. They lived together in Peking, in 1935, where Parsons developed Hodgkin's disease, of which he died in Zurich, in 1937, at 26 years old. Byron was left devastated.

== Death, reputation and legacy ==
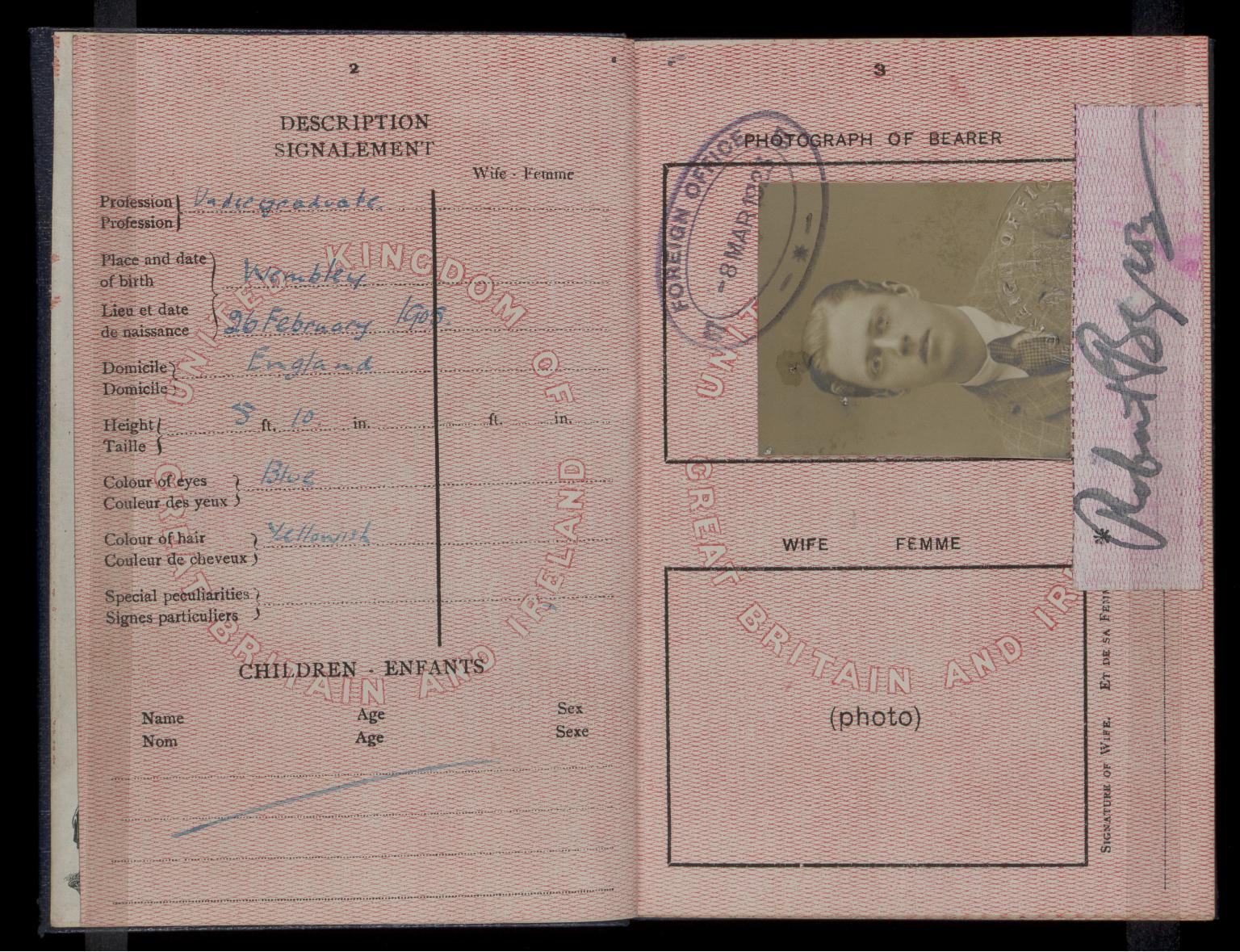
Robert Byron's British passport issued in 1923

Byron died aged 35 in 1941, during World War II, when the ship on which he was travelling was torpedoed en route to West Africa. Byron was destined for Egypt and would likely have transshipped on arrival and continued his journey via the Cape. The SS Jonathan Holt was torpedoed by U-97, a Type VIIC submarine, in the North Atlantic off Cape Wrath. His body was never found.

An acquaintance from early days, Evelyn Waugh noted Byron's gumption. In 1929 he wrote to Henry Yorke "I hear Robert has beaten us all by going to India in an aeroplane which is the sort of success which I call tangible." But writing in 1948, Waugh said of Byron in a letter to Harold Acton: "It is not yet the time to say so but I greatly disliked Robert in his last years & think he was a dangerous lunatic better off dead." The passionately anti-communist Waugh believed that during the 1930s Byron had become pro-Soviet, though Byron's – and Waugh's – biographer Christopher Sykes firmly denied any such sympathy on Byron's part.

Prince Charles read Byron's prose All These I Learnt on BBC Radio 4 on National Poetry Day, 5 October 2006.

In February 2012, his book Europe in the Looking Glass was serialised by BBC's Radio 4 Book of the Week. The program included detailed passages of Germany and an eyewitness report of the 1922 Greek refugee exodus and massacres following the Great Fire of Smyrna.

== Bibliography ==
- Europe in the Looking-Glass: Reflections of a Motor Drive from Grimsby to Athens (London: George Routledge and Sons, 1926)
- The Station (London: Duckworth, 1928; New York: Alfred A. Knopf, 1928) – visiting the Greek monasteries of Mount Athos with Mark Ogilvie-Grant and David Talbot Rice
- The Byzantine Achievement (London: George Routledge & Sons, 1929)
- Birth of Western Painting: A History of Colour, Form, and Iconography. (London: George Routledge & Sons, 1930)
- An Essay on India (London: George Routledge & Sons, 1931)
- The Appreciation of Architecture (London: Wishart & Co., 1932, Adelphi Quartos series)
- First Russia, Then Tibet (London: Macmillan & Co., 1933)
- The Road to Oxiana (London: Macmillan & Co., 1937) – visiting Persia and Afghanistan
- Imperial Pilgrimage (London: London Passenger Transport Board, 1937) – a small guide to London from the "London in Your Pocket Series"
- Letters Home (London: John Murray, 1991) - edited by Lucy Butler (his sister). ISBN 0-7195-4921-3

== Literary archives ==
- Robert Byron Papers in General Collection, Beinecke Rare Book and Manuscript Library, Yale University
