= Hugh Lygon =

British noble (1904-1936)

The Honourable Hugh Lygon
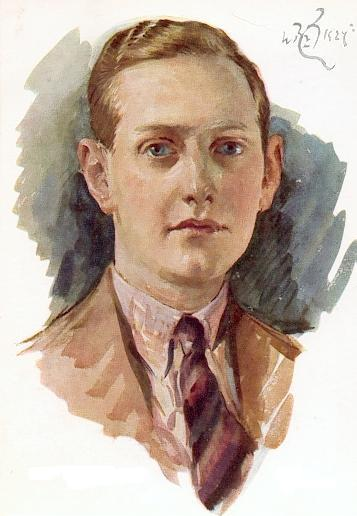
- Portrait of The Hon. Hugh Lygon, by Ranken (1927).
- Born: Hugh Patrick Lygon; 2 November 1904
- Died: 19 August 1936 (aged 31); Rothenburg, Bavaria
- Parents: William Lygon, 7th Earl Beauchamp (father); Lady Lettice Grosvenor (mother)

Hugh Patrick Lygon (2 November 1904 – 19 August 1936) was the second son of William Lygon, 7th Earl Beauchamp. He was initially believed to be the inspiration for Lord Sebastian Flyte in Evelyn Waugh's Brideshead Revisited, though Waugh told the Lygon family that this was not the case. Waugh later revealed that the character was mostly influenced by Alastair Hugh Graham.

Along with their contemporaries Robert Byron, Murray Andrew McLean, and the Plunket Greene brothers, Richard and David, they were both members of the Hypocrites' Club, of which Lygon was also president. David Plunket Greene was a good friend of Hugh Lygon.

== Education ==
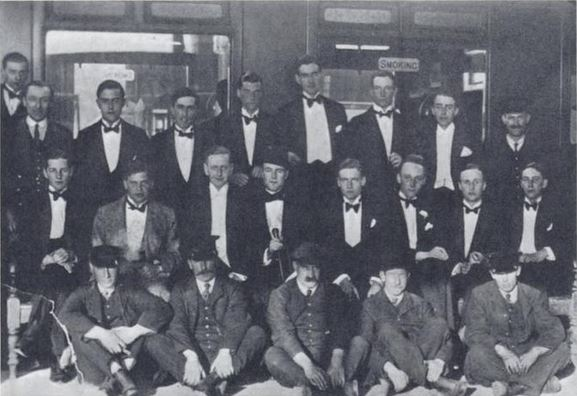
Railway Club at Oxford, conceived by John Sutro, dominated by Harold Acton. Left to right, back: Henry Yorke, Roy Harrod, Henry Weymouth, David Plunket Greene, Harry Stavordale, Brian Howard. Middle row: Michael Rosse, John Sutro, Hugh Lygon, Harold Acton, Bryan Guinness, Patrick Balfour, Mark Ogilvie-Grant, Johnny Drury-Lowe; front: porters.

He was educated at Eton and Pembroke College, Oxford. While at Oxford, Lygon was part of the Oxford Railway Club.

After leaving Oxford he worked in a bank in Paris before working in the City.

== Death ==
Lygon died in Germany in 1936, during a road trip with his friend, the artist Henry Wynn (a son of Lady Newborough). Lygon was standing in the road asking for directions, and accidentally fell backwards, hitting his head. Lygon spent four days in a hospital in Rothenburg ob der Tauber, eventually dying from a skull fracture suffered during the fall. His body was returned to England.
