= Hugh Armigel Wade =

English songwriter and musician (1907–1949)

Hugh Armigel Wade (1 July 1907 – 10 April 1949) was an English songwriter and musician.

== Biography ==
Hugh Armigel Wade was born in Market Deeping, Lincolnshire, on 1 July 1907. He was the third son of solicitor Richard Wade and his wife Alice. The Wade family lived at The Park, Market Deeping, in a building later renamed as Wade House.

When Wade was 15 he won the Marlborough College Prize for Instrumental Composition. By the 1920s, Hugh Armigel Wade was hailed as one of the "youngest musical talents in Britain".

In 1926, Wade was promoted by the Shaftesbury Avenue musical publishers, Bert Feldman. When the Love Bird Leaves the Nest was a fox-trot favourably received by the public. In February 1928 the magazine The Era promoted Wade's fox-trot When I Met Sally. Other compositions are When the Swallows Fly Home, Rosalie, Like a Virginia Creeper, Why Am I Blue, Somewhere in Samarsk.

Wade was active in London social life at the time, including the Bright Young Things. On 30 May 1932, Wade was among the guests of the dinner party of Elvira Mullens Barney and Michael Scott Stephen at 21 William Mews; among the other guests: Arthur Jeffress, Sylvia Coke, Denys Skeffington Smyth, Brian Howard, Anton Altmann, Irene Mac Brayne, Arthur Streek, Olivia Wyndham and her then girlfriend, Catherine "Ruth" Baldwin (the longtime companion of Joe Carstairs), Edward Gathorne-Hardy. On the early morning of 31 May 1932, Stephen died of bullet wound and Barney was arrested and charged with murder. Hugh Armigel Wade and Arthur Jeffress appeared as witnesses at the trial.

In 1936, he collaborated on "To and Fro", in the 1940s worked with Leigh Stafford on Let it be Soon, and in 1948, he wrote Time May Change for the musical Maid To Measure.

His songs were performed by:

- Florrie Forde - "When the Lovebird Leaves the Nest"
- Carl Brisson - "Why am I Blue?" "When I Met Sally"
- Henry Hall and the BBC Dance Orchestra - "Singing in the Moonlight"
- Layton and Johnstone - "Singing in the Moonlight"
- The Melody Boys - "Singing in the Moonlight"
- Charles Hill - "Rosalie"
- Ted Heath - "Let it be Soon"
- Charlie Chester and his Gang - "Let it be Soon"
- Geraldo, Doreen Lundy (voc) - "Souvenir de Paris"
- Ann Shelton - "Souvenir de Paris"
- Doreen Lundy and the Skyrockets - "Let it be Soon"
- Jessie Mathews - "Time May Change"
- Charlie Kunz - "Let it be Soon"

He died on 10 April 1949.
