= Elvira Barney =

English socialite and actress (1904–1936)

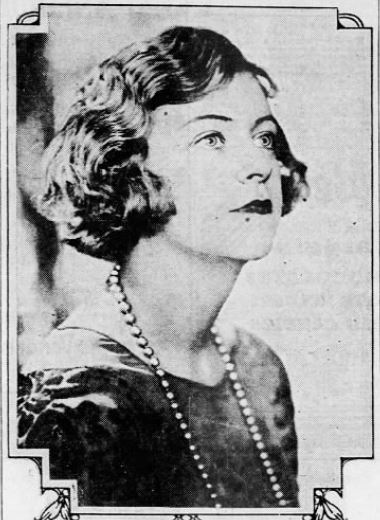
- Born: Elvira Enid Mullens; 22 January 1904
- Died: 25 December 1936 (aged 32); Paris, France
- Other name: Dolores Ashley
- Years active: 1925–1933
- Movement: Bright Young Things
- Spouse: John Sterling Barney (m. 1928–1933)
- Partners: Charles Patrick Graves; Thomas Michael Scott Stephen

Elvira Enid Barney (née Mullens; 22 January 1904 – 25 December 1936) was an English socialite and actress known professionally as Dolores Ashley. She was tried for the murder of her lover, Michael Scott Stephen, in 1932. The trial was widely reported by the British press. She was later found not guilty, but died four years later in a Paris hotel room.

Barney was part of the Bright Young Things group of socialites and aristocrats in the 1920s.

== Early life ==
Elvira Mullens was born on 22 January 1904, the daughter of Evelyne Maude Adamson (1874-1962) and stockbroker Sir John Ashley Mullens (1869–1937). Her younger sister Avril Joy Mullens married three times, including a short marriage to Ernest Aldrich Simpson, ex-husband of Wallis Simpson.

In 1924, Elvira attended Lady Benson's Drama Academy, studying under Constance Benson. During this time, she was engaged to Charles Patrick Graves. During the 1924–25 theatre season she appeared in The Blue Kitten at the Gaiety Theatre.

She met American singer John Sterling Barney at a party in 1927. They were married on 2 August 1928, but John Barney returned to America the following year.

In 1931, Elvira moved to 21 William Mews, Knightsbridge, London, sharing the house with Henry Mervyn Pearce. She later met Michael Scott Stephen while in Paris. He moved into William Mews sometime before May 1932.

== Trial and aftermath ==
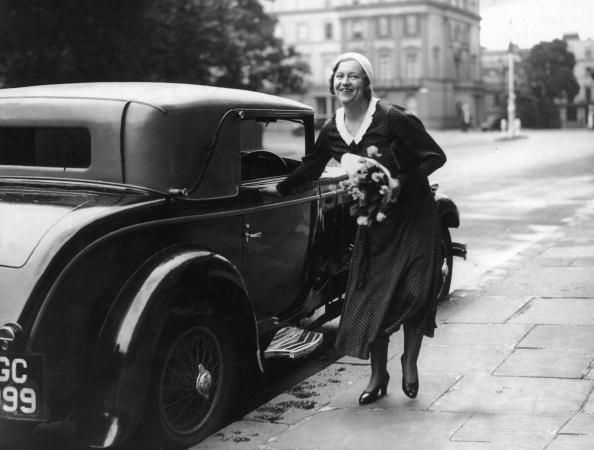
Elvira Barney after her trial in 1932

On 30 May 1932, Barney and Stephen hosted a dinner party at their home. Among the guests were Arthur Jeffress, Hugh Armigel Wade, Sylvia Coke, Denys Skeffington Smyth, Brian Howard, Anton Altmann, Irene MacBrayne, Arthur Streek, and Olivia Wyndham and her then-girlfriend Ruth Baldwin, a longtime companion of Joe Carstairs, and Edward Gathorne-Hardy. Barney, Stephen, and some of their guests then went to The Blue Angel, a private club on Dean Street. The following morning, Stephen died of bullet wounds and Barney was arrested and charged with murder.

Barney was defended at her trial by Sir Patrick Hastings, who portrayed her as the innocent party and the victim of little value. Wade and Jeffress gave testimony. Altmann, Howard, MacBrayne, Coke, Streek, Fester, and Skeffington-Smyth also gave statements, some of which were read in court.

The judge, Sir Travers Humphreys, described Hastings' closing remarks as "certainly one of the finest speeches I have ever heard". Barney was found not guilty of murder and manslaughter, but she was convicted of possession of a firearm. The press reported on Barney boasting of killing Stephen at a celebration party following the verdict.

Barney's family disowned her and she moved to France. She was found dead in a Paris hotel room on 25 December 1936 after returning drunk the night before.

== Portrayals ==
Barney believed the profligate socialite Agatha Runcible in Evelyn Waugh's Vile Bodies was based on her. However, Runcible was a caricature of Elizabeth Ponsonby.

Barney was portrayed by the actress Nicola Duffett in Laugh Baby Laugh, a 1993 segment of the true crime TV series In Suspicious Circumstances.

== See also ==
- Vile Bodies — novel by Evelyn Waugh.
