= Bright young things =

1920s group of aristocratic socialites

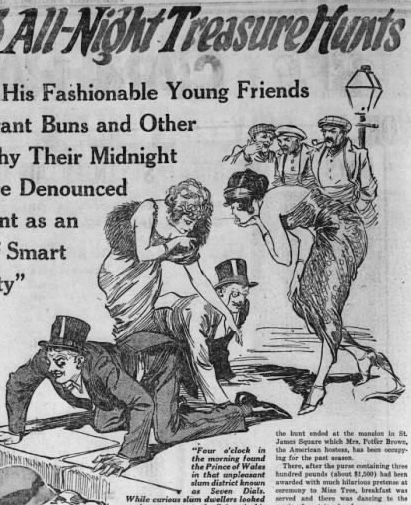
The Prince of Wales and his fashionable friends, members of the Bright Young things, took part in an all-night treasure hunting, which was observed by the slum dwellers, at four o’clock – Argus-Leader, 06 Sep 1924.

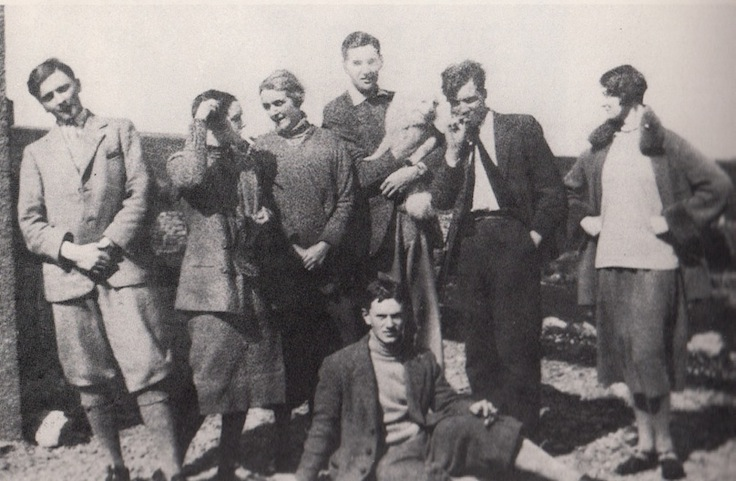
Richard Plunket Greene, Olivia Plunket Greene, David Plunket Greene, Terence Greenidge, Elizabeth Frances Russell, and Evelyn Waugh.

The Bright Young Things, or Bright Young People, was a group of bohemian young aristocrats and socialites in London during the 1920s. The name was given to them by the tabloid press. They threw flamboyant fancy dress parties, went on elaborate treasure hunts through nighttime London, and some drank heavily or used illicit drugs — all of which was enthusiastically covered by journalists such as Charles Graves and Tom Driberg.

They inspired a number of writers, including Nancy Mitford (Highland Fling), Anthony Powell (A Dance to the Music of Time), Henry Green (Party Going), Dorothy L. Sayers (Murder Must Advertise), and the poet John Betjeman. Evelyn Waugh's 1930 novel Vile Bodies, adapted as the 2003 film Bright Young Things, is a satirical look at this scene. Cecil Beaton began his career in photography by documenting this set, of which he was a member.

Prominent members of the group included:

- Harold Acton
- Patrick Balfour, Baron Kinross
- Cecil Beaton
- John Betjeman
- Edward Burra
- Robert Byron
- Sheila Chisholm
- Daphne Fielding
- Edward Gathorne-Hardy
- Terence Greenidge
- Bryan Guinness
- Gavin Henderson
- Brian Howard
- Arthur Jeffress
- Teresa Jungman
- Zita Jungman
- Barbara Ker-Seymer
- Oliver Messel
- Diana Mitford
- Nancy Mitford
- Beverley Nichols
- Brenda Dean Paul
- Babe Plunket Greene
- David Plunket Greene
- Olivia Plunket Greene
- Richard Plunket Greene
- Elizabeth Ponsonby
- Loelia Ponsonby
- Anthony Powell
- Elizabeth Russell
- Edith Sitwell
- Osbert Sitwell
- Sacheverell Sitwell
- Eleanor Smith
- David Tennant
- Stephen Tennant
- Henry Thynne
- William Walton
- Sylvia Townsend Warner
- Evelyn Waugh
- Rex Whistler
- Sunday Wilshin
- Olivia Wyndham
- Henry Yorke

== List of 'Bright Young Things', their associates, and those who documented them ==
The following is a list of the Bright Young Things, their friends, acquaintances and associates of the period, many of whom were the basis for characters in the novels written by members of the group such as Evelyn Waugh, Anthony Powell and Nancy Mitford.

Image	Name	Characterization
	Harold Acton (1904–1994)	Books: Bright Young People: The Lost Generation of London's Jazz Age by D.J. Taylor; The Brideshead Generation: Evelyn Waugh and His Friends by Humphrey Carpenter; Brian Howard: Portrait of a Failure by Marie-Jaqueline Lancaster
	William Acton (1906–1945)	Books: Brian Howard: Portrait of a Failure by Marie-Jaqueline Lancaster; Newspaper articles: Mozart Fancy Dress Concert is Picturesque
	Kathleen Adam Smith (1900–1941)	Newspaper articles: Bright Young People of the Rising Generation
	John Amery (1912–1945)	Books: Bright Young People: The Lost Generation of London's Jazz Age by D.J. Taylor
	Leo Amery (1873–1955)	Books: Bright Young People: The Lost Generation of London's Jazz Age by D.J. Taylor
	Michael Arlen (1895–1956)	Books: Bright Young People: The Lost Generation of London's Jazz Age by D.J. Taylor; Newspaper articles: Amusing Turns Brighten Coming-of-Age Party
	Sylvia Ashley (1904–1977)	Books: The Book of Beauty by Cecil Beaton; Portraits: 1933, Anthony Wysard (1907–1984)
	Anthony Ashley-Cooper (1900–1947)	Books: Bright Young People: The Lost Generation of London's Jazz Age by D.J. Taylor
	Lettice Ashley-Cooper (1911–1990)	Newspaper articles: Amusing Turns Brighten Coming-of-Age Party
	Mary Ashley-Cooper (1902–1936)	Newspaper articles: Amusing Turns Brighten Coming-of-Age Party
	Adele Astaire (1896–1981)	Books: The Book of Beauty by Cecil Beaton
	Clement Attlee (1883–1967)	Books: Bright Young People: The Lost Generation of London's Jazz Age by D.J. Taylor
	Mae Bacon (1897–1981)	Newspaper articles: London Society's Thrilling All-Night Treasure Hunts
	Hermione Baddeley (1906–1986)	Books: Bright Young People: The Lost Generation of London's Jazz Age by D.J. Taylor; Newspaper articles: Blackout of the Hon. Elizabeth's Wild 20-year-party Mozart Fancy Dress Concert is Picturesque
	Edythe Baker (1899–1971)	Newspaper articles: Amusing Turns Brighten Coming-of-Age Party
	Oliver Baldwin (1899–1958)	Books: Bright Young People: The Lost Generation of London's Jazz Age by D.J. Taylor
	Ruth Baldwin (1905–1937)	Books: Script Doctors and Vicious Addicts
	Patrick Balfour (1904–1976)	Books: Bright Young People: The Lost Generation of London's Jazz Age by D.J. Taylor; The Brideshead Generation: Evelyn Waugh and His Friends by Humphrey Carpenter; Brian Howard: Portrait of a Failure by Marie-Jaqueline Lancaster; Portraits: 1930, Anthony Wysard (1907–1984)
	Thomas Balston (1883–1967)	Books: Bright Young People: The Lost Generation of London's Jazz Age by D.J. Taylor
	Tallulah Bankhead (1902–1968)	Books: The Book of Beauty by Cecil Beaton; Bright Young People: The Lost Generation of London's Jazz Age by D.J. Taylor; Newspaper articles: London Society's Thrilling All-Night Treasure Hunts
	John Banting (1902–1972)	Books: Bright Young People: The Lost Generation of London's Jazz Age by D.J. Taylor
	Alexander Baring (1898–1991)	Newspaper articles: Bright Young People of the Rising Generation
	Maurice Baring (1874–1945)	Books: Bright Young People: The Lost Generation of London's Jazz Age by D.J. Taylor
	Poppy Baring (1901–1980)	Newspaper articles: Amusing Turns Brighten Coming-of-Age Party
	Elvira Dolores Barney (1904–1936)	Books: Bright Young People: The Lost Generation of London's Jazz Age by D.J. Taylor
	H. M. Bateman (1887–1970)	Books: Bright Young People: The Lost Generation of London's Jazz Age by D.J. Taylor
	Beverley Baxter (1891–1964)	Books: Bright Young People: The Lost Generation of London's Jazz Age by D.J. Taylor
	Baba Beaton (1912–1973)	Books: The Book of Beauty by Cecil Beaton; Bright Young People: The Lost Generation of London's Jazz Age by D.J. Taylor; Dancing to the Music of Time by Anthony Powell; Newspaper articles: Mozart Fancy Dress Concert is Picturesque
	Cecil Beaton (1904–1980)	Books: Bright Young People: The Lost Generation of London's Jazz Age by D.J. Taylor; Portraits: 1930, Anthony Wysard (1907–1984)
	Nancy Beaton (1909–1999)	Books: The Book of Beauty by Cecil Beaton; Bright Young People: The Lost Generation of London's Jazz Age by D.J. Taylor
	Max Beerbohm (1872–1956)	Books: Bright Young People: The Lost Generation of London's Jazz Age by D.J. Taylor
	Clive Bell (1881–1964)	Books: Bright Young People: The Lost Generation of London's Jazz Age by D.J. Taylor
	Hilaire Belloc (1870–1953)	Books: Bright Young People: The Lost Generation of London's Jazz Age by D.J. Taylor
	Babe Bendir (b. 1907)	Books: Bright Young People: The Lost Generation of London's Jazz Age by D.J. Taylor; Newspaper articles: Mozart Fancy Dress Concert is Picturesque
	Margot Bendir	Newspaper articles: Mozart Fancy Dress Concert is Picturesque
	Lord Berners (1883–1950)	Books: Bright Young People: The Lost Generation of London's Jazz Age by D.J. Taylor; Fictional characters: Lord Merlin in Love in a Cold Climate by Nancy Mitford; Lord Merlin in The Pursuit of Love by Nancy Mitford
	John Betjeman (1906–1984)	Books: Bright Young People: The Lost Generation of London's Jazz Age by D.J. Taylor; The Brideshead Generation: Evelyn Waugh and His Friends by Humphrey Carpenter; Fictional characters: Paul Fotheringay in Christmas Pudding by Nancy Mitford
	Elizabeth Bibesco (1897–1945)	Books: Bright Young People: The Lost Generation of London's Jazz Age by D.J. Taylor
	Caroline Blackwood (1931–1996)	Books: Bright Young People: The Lost Generation of London's Jazz Age by D.J. Taylor
	Edmund Blunden (1896–1974)	Books: Bright Young People: The Lost Generation of London's Jazz Age by D.J. Taylor
	Robert Boothby (1900–1986)	Books: Bright Young People: The Lost Generation of London's Jazz Age by D.J. Taylor
	Elizabeth Bowes-Lyon (1900–2002)	Newspaper articles: London Society's Thrilling All-Night Treasure Hunts
	Maurice Bowra (1898–1971)	Books: Bright Young People: The Lost Generation of London's Jazz Age by D.J. Taylor; The Brideshead Generation: Evelyn Waugh and His Friends by Humphrey Carpenter; Brian Howard: Portrait of a Failure by Marie-Jaqueline Lancaster
	Brendan Bracken (1901–1958)	Fictional characters: Rex Mottram in Brideshead Revisited by Evelyn Waugh
	Georges Braque (1882–1963)	Books: Bright Young People: The Lost Generation of London's Jazz Age by D.J. Taylor
	Lady Diana Bridgeman (1907–1967)	Books: The Book of Beauty by Cecil Beaton; Newspaper articles: Amusing Turns Brighten Coming-of-Age Party
	Jessie Doris Browne (1900–1942)	Portraits: 1931, Anthony Wysard (1907–1984)
	Valentine Browne (1891–1943)	Books: Bright Young People: The Lost Generation of London's Jazz Age by D.J. Taylor; Portraits: 1931, Anthony Wysard (1907–1984)
	Frank Buchman (1878–1961)	Books: Bright Young People: The Lost Generation of London's Jazz Age by D.J. Taylor
	Guy Burgess (1911–1963)	Books: Bright Young People: The Lost Generation of London's Jazz Age by D.J. Taylor
	Edward Burra (1905–1976)	Books: Bright Young People: The Lost Generation of London's Jazz Age by D.J. Taylor
	Mary Butts (1890–1937)	Books: Bright Young People: The Lost Generation of London's Jazz Age by D.J. Taylor
	Robert Byron (1905–1941)	Books: Bright Young People: The Lost Generation of London's Jazz Age by D.J. Taylor; The Brideshead Generation: Evelyn Waugh and His Friends by Humphrey Carpenter; Fictional characters: Albert Gates in Highland Fling by Nancy Mitford; Ben Gore in Blindness by Henry Green
	Denis Capel-Dunn (1903–1945)	Books: Script Doctors and Vicious Addicts; Fictional characters: Kenneth Widmerpool in A Dance to the Music of Time by Anthony Powell
	Dudley Carew (1903–1981)	Books: Script Doctors and Vicious Addicts
	Billie Carleton (1896–1918)	Books: Bright Young People: The Lost Generation of London's Jazz Age by D.J. Taylor
	Dora Carrington (1893–1932)	Fictional characters: Betty Blyth in The Apes of God by Wyndham Lewis
	Audrey Carten (1900–1977)	
	Kenneth Carten (1911–1980)	
	Waveney Carten (1902–1990)	
	Barbara Cartland (1901–2000)	Books: Bright Young People: The Lost Generation of London's Jazz Age by D.J. Taylor
	Ivy Cavendish-Bentinck (1887–1982)	Books: The Book of Beauty by Cecil Beaton
	Victor Cazalet (1896–1943)	Books: Bright Young People: The Lost Generation of London's Jazz Age by D.J. Taylor
	David Cecil (1902–1986)	
	David Cecil (1905–1981)	Portraits: Anthony Wysard (1907–1984)
	William Chappell (1907–1994)	Books: Bright Young People: The Lost Generation of London's Jazz Age by D.J. Taylor
	Nina Chavchavadze (1901–1974)	Newspaper articles: Bright Young People of the Rising Generation
	G. K. Chesterton (1874–1936)	Books: Bright Young People: The Lost Generation of London's Jazz Age by D.J. Taylor
	Edward Chichester (1903–1975)	Books: Bright Young People: The Lost Generation of London's Jazz Age by D.J. Taylor; Portraits: 1930, Anthony Wysard (1907–1984)
	Sheila Chisholm (1895–1969)	
	Diana Churchill (1909–1963)	Books: Bright Young People: The Lost Generation of London's Jazz Age by D.J. Taylor
	John Spencer-Churchill (1897–1972)	Portraits: 1934, Anthony Wysard (1907–1984)
	Camille Clifford (1885–1971)	Books: The Book of Beauty by Cecil Beaton
	Claud Cockburn (1904–1981)	Books: Bright Young People: The Lost Generation of London's Jazz Age by D.J. Taylor
	Nevill Coghill (1899–1980)	Books: Bright Young People: The Lost Generation of London's Jazz Age by D.J. Taylor
	Sibyl Colefax (1874–1950)	Books: Bright Young People: The Lost Generation of London's Jazz Age by D.J. Taylor
	Cyril Connolly (1903–1974)	Books: Bright Young People: The Lost Generation of London's Jazz Age by D.J. Taylor; The Brideshead Generation: Evelyn Waugh and His Friends by Humphrey Carpenter; Fictional characters: Ed Spain in The Blessing by Nancy Mitford
	Diana Cooper (1892–1986)	Books: The Book of Beauty by Cecil Beaton; Bright Young People: The Lost Generation of London's Jazz Age by D.J. Taylor; The Brideshead Generation: Evelyn Waugh and His Friends by Humphrey Carpenter; Fictional characters: Mrs. Stitch, Evelyn Waugh novels Lady Leone in Don't Tell Alfred by Nancy Mitford; Lady Artemis Hooper in Aaron's Rod by D.H. Lawrence; Ruby, Lady Maclean in The Love and Envied by Enid Bagnold; Lady Queenie Paulle in The Pretty Lady by Arnold Bennett; Newspaper articles: Young People Take Big Treasure Hunt; Showing Aside the Jazz Set in English Society
	Duff Cooper (1890–1954)	Newspaper articles: Showing Aside the Jazz Set in English Society
	Gladys Cooper (1888–1971)	Books: Bright Young People: The Lost Generation of London's Jazz Age by D.J. Taylor; Newspaper articles: Young People Take Big Treasure Hunt; London Society's Thrilling All-Night Treasure Hunts; Portraits: Anthony Wysard (1907–1984)
	Noël Coward (1899–1973)	Books: Bright Young People: The Lost Generation of London's Jazz Age by D.J. Taylor; Fictional characters: Max Pilgrim in A Dance to the Music of Time by Anthony Powell
	Frederick Heyworth Cripps (1885–1977)	Portraits: 1938, Anthony Wysard (1907–1984)
	Violet Cripps (1891–1983)	Portraits: 1938, Anthony Wysard (1907–1984)
	C. R. M. F. Cruttwell (1887–1941)	Books: The Brideshead Generation: Evelyn Waugh and His Friends by Humphrey Carpenter
	Alexandra Curzon (1904–1995)	Newspaper articles: Bright Young People of the Rising Generation
	Cynthia Curzon (1898–1933)	
	Georgiana Curzon (1910–1976)	Books: The Book of Beauty by Cecil Beaton
	Irene Curzon (1896–1966)	Newspaper articles: Bright Young People of the Rising Generation
	Mary Curzon (1887–1962)	Books: The Book of Beauty by Cecil Beaton
	Peregrine Cust (1899–1978)	Newspaper articles: Showing Aside the Jazz Set in English Society
	Hugh Dalton (1887–1962)	Books: Bright Young People: The Lost Generation of London's Jazz Age by D.J. Taylor
	Brenda Dean Paul (1907–1959)	Books: Bright Young People: The Lost Generation of London's Jazz Age by D.J. Taylor; Script Doctors and Vicious Addicts; Newspaper articles: Blackout of the Hon. Elizabeth's Wild 20-year-party
	Napper Dean Paul (1904–1972)	Books: Script Doctors and Vicious Addicts
	Warwick Deeping (1877–1950)	Books: Bright Young People: The Lost Generation of London's Jazz Age by D.J. Taylor
	Alec Douglas-Home (1903–1995)	Books: Bright Young People: The Lost Generation of London's Jazz Age by D.J. Taylor
	Elizabeth Douglas-Scott-Montagu (1909–2002)	Books: Bright Young People: The Lost Generation of London's Jazz Age by D.J. Taylor
	Tom Driberg (1905–1976)	Books: Bright Young People: The Lost Generation of London's Jazz Age by D.J. Taylor; The Brideshead Generation: Evelyn Waugh and His Friends by Humphrey Carpenter
	John Drury-Lowe (1905–1960)	Books: Brian Howard: Portrait of a Failure by Marie-Jaqueline Lancaster
	Gerald du Maurier (1873–1934)	Books: Bright Young People: The Lost Generation of London's Jazz Age by D.J. Taylor
	Freda Dudley Ward (1894–1983)	Books: The Book of Beauty by Cecil Beaton; Newspaper articles: Showing Aside the Jazz Set in English Society; London Society's Thrilling All-Night Treasure Hunts
	Alfred Duggan (1903–1964)	Books: Bright Young People: The Lost Generation of London's Jazz Age by D.J. Taylor; The Brideshead Generation: Evelyn Waugh and His Friends by Humphrey Carpenter
	Hubert Duggan (1904–1943)	Fictional characters: Charles Stringham in A Dance to the Music of Time by Anthony Powell
	Dola Dunsmuir (1903–1966)	
	Anthony Eden (1897–1977)	Books: Bright Young People: The Lost Generation of London's Jazz Age by D.J. Taylor
	Edward Elgar (1857–1934)	Portraits: Anthony Wysard (1907–1984)
	T. S. Eliot (1888–1965)	Books: Bright Young People: The Lost Generation of London's Jazz Age by D.J. Taylor
	Lily Elsie (1886–1962)	Books: The Book of Beauty by Cecil Beaton
	Baba d'Erlanger (1901–1945)	Books: Bright Young People: The Lost Generation of London's Jazz Age by D.J. Taylor; Portraits: 1930, Anthony Wysard (1907–1984)
	Mimi d'Erlanger (1874–1959)	Books: Bright Young People: The Lost Generation of London's Jazz Age by D.J. Taylor; Fictional characters Countess Flor di Folio in Serena Blandish by Enid Bagnold; Portraits: 1930, Anthony Wysard (1907–1984)
	Hamish St. Clair Erskine (1909–1973)	Books: Bright Young People: The Lost Generation of London's Jazz Age by D.J. Taylor; Fictional characters: Highland Fling by Nancy Mitford; Sir Roderick "Bobby" Bobbin in Christmas Pudding by Nancy Mitford
	Gwen Farrar (1899–1944)	
	Daisy Fellowes (1902–1945)	Books: The Book of Beauty by Cecil Beaton
	Dorothy Fellowes-Gordon (1891–1991)	
	Gwen Ffrangcon-Davies (1891–1992)	Newspaper articles: Mozart Fancy Dress Concert is Picturesque
	Daphne Fielding (1904–1997)	Books: Bright Young People: The Lost Generation of London's Jazz Age by D.J. Taylor; Portraits: 1940, Anthony Wysard (1907–1984)
	Ronald Firbank (1886–1926)	Books: Bright Young People: The Lost Generation of London's Jazz Age by D.J. Taylor
	Michael Foot (1913–2010)	Portraits: 1948, Anthony Wysard (1907–1984)
	E. M. Forster (1879–1970)	Books: Bright Young People: The Lost Generation of London's Jazz Age by D.J. Taylor
	Harry Fox-Strangways (1905–1964)	Books: Brian Howard: Portrait of a Failure by Marie-Jaqueline Lancaster
	Gilbert Frankau (1884–1952)	Books: Bright Young People: The Lost Generation of London's Jazz Age by D.J. Taylor
	Maxine Freeman-Thomas (1901–1984)	Books: The Book of Beauty by Cecil Beaton
	Essex French (1907–1996)	Books: The Book of Beauty by Cecil Beaton
	Valerie French (1909–1997)	Books: The Book of Beauty by Cecil Beaton
	Anthea Gamble (1906–1960)	Books: Bright Young People: The Lost Generation of London's Jazz Age by D.J. Taylor; Script Doctors and Vicious Addicts
	Patrick Gamble (1904–1956)	
	Evelyn Gardner (1903–1994)	Books: Bright Young People: The Lost Generation of London's Jazz Age by D.J. Taylor; The Brideshead Generation: Evelyn Waugh and His Friends by Humphrey Carpenter; Fictional characters: Brenda Last in A Handful of Dust by Evelyn Waugh
	Edward Gathorne-Hardy (1901–1978)	Books: Bright Young People: The Lost Generation of London's Jazz Age by D.J. Taylor; Newspaper articles: Blackout of the Hon. Elizabeth's Wild 20-year-party
	Robert Gathorne-Hardy (1902–1973)	
	Paula Gellibrand (1898–1986)	Books: The Book of Beauty by Cecil Beaton; Serena Blandish by Enid Bagnold
	Douglas Goldring (1887–1960)	Books: Bright Young People: The Lost Generation of London's Jazz Age by D.J. Taylor
	Victor Gollancz (1893–1967)	Books: Bright Young People: The Lost Generation of London's Jazz Age by D.J. Taylor
	Alastair Graham (1904–1982)	Books: Bright Young People: The Lost Generation of London's Jazz Age by D.J. Taylor; The Brideshead Generation: Evelyn Waugh and His Friends by Humphrey Carpenter; Fictional characters: Lord Sebastian Flyte in Brideshead Revisited by Evelyn Waugh
	Robert Graves (1895–1985)	Books: Bright Young People: The Lost Generation of London's Jazz Age by D.J. Taylor
	Henry Green (1905–1973)	Books: Bright Young People: The Lost Generation of London's Jazz Age by D.J. Taylor; The Brideshead Generation: Evelyn Waugh and His Friends by Humphrey Carpenter; Brian Howard: Portrait of a Failure by Marie-Jaqueline Lancaster
	Graham Greene (1904–1991)	Books: The Brideshead Generation: Evelyn Waugh and His Friends by Humphrey Carpenter
	Terence Greenidge (1902–1970)	Books: The Brideshead Generation: Evelyn Waugh and His Friends by Humphrey Carpenter
	Ivor Guest (1903–1967)	Portraits: 1936, Anthony Wysard (1907–1984)
	Aileen Guinness (1904–1999)	
	Bryan Guinness (1905–1992)	Books: Bright Young People: The Lost Generation of London's Jazz Age by D.J. Taylor; Brian Howard: Portrait of a Failure by Marie-Jaqueline Lancaster; Newspaper articles: Blackout of the Hon. Elizabeth's Wild 20-year-party
	Loel Guinness (1906–1988)	Newspaper articles: Amusing Turns Brighten Coming-of-Age Party
	Maureen Guinness (1907–1998)	
	Meraud Guinness (1904–1993)	Books: Bright Young People: The Lost Generation of London's Jazz Age by D.J. Taylor
	Oonagh Guinness (1910–1995)	Portraits: 1930, Anthony Wysard (1907–1984)
	Walter Guinness (1880–1944)	Books: Bright Young People: The Lost Generation of London's Jazz Age by D.J. Taylor
	Claud Hamilton (1889–1975)	Books: Brian Howard: Portrait of a Failure by Marie-Jaqueline Lancaster
	Patrick Hamilton (1904–1962)	Books: Bright Young People: The Lost Generation of London's Jazz Age by D.J. Taylor
	Nina Hamnett (1890–1965)	Books: Bright Young People: The Lost Generation of London's Jazz Age by D.J. Taylor
	Doris Harcourt (1900–1981)	Newspaper articles: Bright Young People of the Rising Generation
	Allanah Harper (1904–1992)	Books: Bright Young People: The Lost Generation of London's Jazz Age by D.J. Taylor
	Pamela Harriman (1920–1997)	Books: Bright Young People: The Lost Generation of London's Jazz Age by D.J. Taylor
	Roy Harrod (1900–1978)	Books: Brian Howard: Portrait of a Failure by Marie-Jaqueline Lancaster
	Deirdre Hart-Davis (1909–1999)	Books: The Book of Beauty by Cecil Beaton
	L. P. Hartley (1895–1972)	
	Norman Hartnell (1901–1979)	Books: Bright Young People: The Lost Generation of London's Jazz Age by D.J. Taylor
	Gavin Henderson (1902–1977)	Books: Bright Young People: The Lost Generation of London's Jazz Age by D.J. Taylor
	A. P. Herbert (1890–1971)	Books: Bright Young People: The Lost Generation of London's Jazz Age by D.J. Taylor
	David Herbert (1908–1995)	
	Sidney Herbert (1906–1969)	Books: Bright Young People: The Lost Generation of London's Jazz Age by D.J. Taylor
	John Heygate (1903–1976)	Books: Bright Young People: The Lost Generation of London's Jazz Age by D.J. Taylor; The Brideshead Generation: Evelyn Waugh and His Friends by Humphrey Carpenter; Fictional characters: John Beaver in A Handful of Dust by Evelyn Waugh; Sir Piers Tofield in Chronicle of Ancient Sunlight by Henry Williamson
	Arden Hilliard (1904–1976)	
	Quintin Hogg (1907–2001)	Portraits: 1948, Anthony Wysard (1907–1984)
	Inez Holden (1903–1974)	Books: Bright Young People: The Lost Generation of London's Jazz Age by D.J. Taylor
	Wanda Holden (1911–1956)	Books: The Book of Beauty by Cecil Beaton
	Vyvyan Holland (1886–1967)	Books: Bright Young People: The Lost Generation of London's Jazz Age by D.J. Taylor
	Christopher Hollis (1902–1977)	Books: The Brideshead Generation: Evelyn Waugh and His Friends by Humphrey Carpenter
	David Horner (1900–1983)	
	Brian Howard (1905–1958)	Books: Bright Young People: The Lost Generation of London's Jazz Age by D.J. Taylor; The Brideshead Generation: Evelyn Waugh and His Friends by Humphrey Carpenter; Brian Howard: Portrait of a Failure by Marie-Jaqueline Lancaster; Script Doctors and Vicious Addicts; Fictional characters Anthony Blanche in Brideshead Revisited by Evelyn Waugh; Donald Butterboy in The Roaring Queen by Wyndham Lewis; Newspaper articles: Blackout of the Hon. Elizabeth's Wild 20-year-party
	Elizabeth Jane Howard (1923–2014)	Books: Bright Young People: The Lost Generation of London's Jazz Age by D.J. Taylor
	William Howard (1902–1978)	Books: Bright Young People: The Lost Generation of London's Jazz Age by D.J. Taylor; The Brideshead Generation: Evelyn Waugh and His Friends by Humphrey Carpenter
	Aldous Huxley (1894–1963)	Books: Bright Young People: The Lost Generation of London's Jazz Age by D.J. Taylor
	Christopher Isherwood (1904–1986)	Books: Bright Young People: The Lost Generation of London's Jazz Age by D.J. Taylor
	Derek Jackson (1906–1982)	
	Audrey James (1902–1968)	Books: The Book of Beauty by Cecil Beaton
	Edward James (1907–1984)	Books: The Brideshead Generation: Evelyn Waugh and His Friends by Humphrey Carpenter
	Julia James (1890–1964)	Books: The Book of Beauty by Cecil Beaton
	Arthur Jeffress (1905–1961)	Books: Alec Waugh, A Year to Remember, A Reminiscence of 1931 Bloomsbury Reader, 1975; D.J. Taylor, Bright Young People - The Lost Generation of London's Jazz Age Farrar, Straus and Giroux, New York, 2007; John Montgomery, The Twenties, George Allen & Unwin Ltd, London, 1970; Portraits: Graham Sutherland, 1954; Ida Kar, 1959
	Douglas Jerrold (1893–1964)	Books: Bright Young People: The Lost Generation of London's Jazz Age by D.J. Taylor
	Augustus John (1878–1961)	Books: Bright Young People: The Lost Generation of London's Jazz Age by D.J. Taylor; Portraits: 1949, Anthony Wysard (1907–1984)
	Baby Jungman (1907–2010)	Books: The Book of Beauty by Cecil Beaton; Bright Young People: The Lost Generation of London's Jazz Age by D.J. Taylor; The Brideshead Generation: Evelyn Waugh and His Friends by Humphrey Carpenter; Portraits: 1930, Anthony Wysard (1907–1984)
	Zita Jungman (1904–2006)	Books: The Book of Beauty by Cecil Beaton; Bright Young People: The Lost Generation of London's Jazz Age by D.J. Taylor; Newspaper articles: Marriage of a "Bright Young Person"
	Barbara Ker-Seymer (1905–1993)	Books: Bright Young People: The Lost Generation of London's Jazz Age by D.J. Taylor
	Nelson Keys (1886–1939)	Newspaper articles: Eminent Victorians
	George Kinnoull (1902–1938)	Newspaper articles: Flaming Youth tries Britain's Patience
	Philip Leyland Kindersley (1907–1995)	Portraits: 1930, Anthony Wysard (1907–1984)
	George Alfred Kolkhorst (1897–1958)	Books: The Brideshead Generation: Evelyn Waugh and His Friends by Humphrey Carpenter
	Constant Lambert (1905–1951)	Books: Bright Young People: The Lost Generation of London's Jazz Age by D.J. Taylor; Fictional characters: Hugh Moreland in A Dance to the Music of Time by Anthony Powell
	Osbert Lancaster (1908–1986)	Books: Bright Young People: The Lost Generation of London's Jazz Age by D.J. Taylor; The Brideshead Generation: Evelyn Waugh and His Friends by Humphrey Carpenter
	Elissa Landi (1904–1948)	Newspaper articles: Amusing Turns Brighten Coming-of-Age Party
	George Lascelles (1923–2011)	Portraits: 1936, Anthony Wysard (1907–1984)
	Charles Laughton (1899–1962)	Portraits: 1936, Anthony Wysard (1907–1984)
	James Laver (1899–1975)	Books: Bright Young People: The Lost Generation of London's Jazz Age by D.J. Taylor
	D. H. Lawrence (1885–1930)	Books: Bright Young People: The Lost Generation of London's Jazz Age by D.J. Taylor
	Gertrude Lawrence (1898–1952)	Books: The Book of Beauty by Cecil Beaton
	James Lees-Milne (1908–1997)	Books: Bright Young People: The Lost Generation of London's Jazz Age by D.J. Taylor; Fictional characters: Albert Gates in Highland Fling by Nancy Mitford
	Rosamond Lehmann (1901–1990)	Books: Bright Young People: The Lost Generation of London's Jazz Age by D.J. Taylor
	F. R. Leavis (1895–1978)	Fictional characters: J G Quiggin in A Dance to the Music of Time by Anthony Powell
	Serge Lifar (1905–1986)	Portraits: 1930, Anthony Wysard (1907–1984)
	John "The Widow" Lloyd (1900–1978)	Books: Bright Young People: The Lost Generation of London's Jazz Age by D.J. Taylor
	Anita Loos (1889–1981)	Books: The Book of Beauty by Cecil Beaton
	Tilly Losch (1903–1975)	Books: The Book of Beauty by Cecil Beaton
	Lady Dorothy Lygon (1912–2001)	Books: The Brideshead Generation: Evelyn Waugh and His Friends by Humphrey Carpenter; Fictional characters: Lady Cordelia Flyte in Brideshead Revisited by Evelyn Waugh
	Hugh Lygon (1904–1936)	Books: Bright Young People: The Lost Generation of London's Jazz Age by D.J. Taylor; The Brideshead Generation: Evelyn Waugh and His Friends by Humphrey Carpenter; Brian Howard: Portrait of a Failure by Marie-Jaqueline Lancaster; Fictional characters: Lord Sebastian Flyte in Brideshead Revisited by Evelyn Waugh; Portraits: 1930, Anthony Wysard (1907–1984)
	Lady Lettice Lygon (1906–1973)	Books: Bright Young People: The Lost Generation of London's Jazz Age by D.J. Taylor; Fictional characters: Brideshead Revisited by Evelyn Waugh
	Lady Mary Lygon (1910–1982)	Books: Bright Young People: The Lost Generation of London's Jazz Age by D.J. Taylor; The Brideshead Generation: Evelyn Waugh and His Friends by Humphrey Carpenter; Fictional characters: Brideshead Revisited by Evelyn Waugh; Vile Bodies by Evelyn Waugh
	Lady Sibell Lygon (1907–2005)	Books: Bright Young People: The Lost Generation of London's Jazz Age by D.J. Taylor; Fictional characters: Brideshead Revisited by Evelyn Waugh; Vile Bodies by Evelyn Waugh
	William Lygon (1903–1979)	Books: Bright Young People: The Lost Generation of London's Jazz Age by D.J. Taylor; The Brideshead Generation: Evelyn Waugh and His Friends by Humphrey Carpenter; Fictional characters: Brideshead Revisited by Evelyn Waugh
	Malcolm MacDonald (1901–1981)	Portraits: 1936, Anthony Wysard (1907–1984)
	Julian MacLaren-Ross (1912–1964)	Books: Bright Young People: The Lost Generation of London's Jazz Age by D.J. Taylor; Fictional characters: X. Trapnel in A Dance to the Music of Time by Anthony Powell
	Ethel Mannin (1900–1984)	Books: Bright Young People: The Lost Generation of London's Jazz Age by D.J. Taylor
	Reginald Manningham-Buller (1905–1980)	Fictional characters: Kenneth Widmerpool in A Dance to the Music of Time by Anthony Powell
	Edward Marjoribanks (1900–1932)	Newspaper articles: Amusing Turns Brighten Coming-of-Age Party
	Frances Marshall (1900–2004)	Books: Bright Young People: The Lost Generation of London's Jazz Age by D.J. Taylor
	Rita Martin (1875–1958)	Books: The Book of Beauty by Cecil Beaton
	W. Somerset Maugham (1874–1965)	Books: Bright Young People: The Lost Generation of London's Jazz Age by D.J. Taylor
	Elsa Maxwell (1883–1963)	Portraits: 1930, Anthony Wysard (1907–1984)
	Harry Melville (1908–2000)	Books: Bright Young People: The Lost Generation of London's Jazz Age by D.J. Taylor; Newspaper articles: Mozart Fancy Dress Concert is Picturesque
	Anne Messel (1902–1992)	Books: The Book of Beauty by Cecil Beaton
	Oliver Messel (1904–1978)	Books: Bright Young People: The Lost Generation of London's Jazz Age by D.J. Taylor; Brian Howard: Portrait of a Failure by Marie-Jaqueline Lancaster; Portraits: 1930, Anthony Wysard (1907–1984)
	Kate Meyrick (1875–1933)	Books: Bright Young People: The Lost Generation of London's Jazz Age by D.J. Taylor Fictional characters: Ma Mayfield in A Handful of Dust and Brideshead Revisited by Evelyn Waugh; Newspaper articles: Flaming Youth tries Britain's Patience
	Florence Mills (1896–1927)	Books: Bright Young People: The Lost Generation of London's Jazz Age by D.J. Taylor
	David Mitford (1878–1958)	Fictional characters: General Murgatroyd in Highland Fling by Nancy Mitford; Uncle Matthew in The Pursuit of Love by Nancy Mitford
	Deborah Mitford (1920–2014)	Fictional characters: Northey Mackintosh in Don't Tell Alfred by Nancy Mitford; Linda Radlett in Love in a Cold Climate by Nancy Mitford; Linda Radlett in The Pursuit of Love by Nancy Mitford
	Diana Mitford (1910–2003)	Books: Bright Young People: The Lost Generation of London's Jazz Age by D.J. Taylor; Newspaper articles: Flaming Youth tries Britain's Patience
	Jessica Mitford (1917–1996)	Books: Bright Young People: The Lost Generation of London's Jazz Age by D.J. Taylor; Fictional characters: Jassy Radlett in Love in a Cold Climate by Nancy Mitford; Jassy Radlett in The Pursuit of Love by Nancy Mitford
	Nancy Mitford (1904–1973)	Books: Bright Young People: The Lost Generation of London's Jazz Age by D.J. Taylor; The Brideshead Generation: Evelyn Waugh and His Friends by Humphrey Carpenter; Fictional characters: Grace Marquise de Valhubert in Don't Tell Alfred by Nancy Mitford; Newspaper articles: Lord Rennell's Son Engaged
	Pamela Mitford (1907–1994)	
	Tom Mitford (1909–1945)	Books: Bright Young People: The Lost Generation of London's Jazz Age by D.J. Taylor
	Unity Mitford (1914–1948)	Books: Bright Young People: The Lost Generation of London's Jazz Age by D.J. Taylor; Fictional characters: Eugenia Malmains in Wigs on the Green by Nancy Mitford
	Ivan Moffat (1918–2002)	Books: Bright Young People: The Lost Generation of London's Jazz Age by D.J. Taylor
	Gwen Mond (d. 1982)	Portraits: 1929, Anthony Wysard (1907–1984)
	Henry Mond (1898–1949)	Portraits: 1929, Anthony Wysard (1907–1984)
	Evan Morgan (1893–1949)	Books: Bright Young People: The Lost Generation of London's Jazz Age by D.J. Taylor; Portraits: 1929, Anthony Wysard (1907–1984)
	Gloria Morgan (1904–1965)	Books: The Book of Beauty by Cecil Beaton
	Thelma Morgan (1904–1970)	Books: The Book of Beauty by Cecil Beaton; Newspaper articles: Showing Aside the Jazz Set in English Society
	Raymond Mortimer (1895–1980)	Books: Bright Young People: The Lost Generation of London's Jazz Age by D.J. Taylor; Portraits: 1936, Anthony Wysard (1907–1984)
	Oswald Mosley (1896–1980)	Books: Bright Young People: The Lost Generation of London's Jazz Age by D.J. Taylor; Newspaper articles: Flaming Youth tries Britain's Patience; Portraits: 1931, Anthony Wysard (1907–1984)
	Edwina Mountbatten (1901–1960)	Books: Bright Young People: The Lost Generation of London's Jazz Age by D.J. Taylor; Newspaper articles: Showing Aside the Jazz Set in English Society
	George Mountbatten (1892–1938)	Newspaper articles: Showing Aside the Jazz Set in English Society
	Irene Mountbatten (1890–1956)	Books: Bright Young People: The Lost Generation of London's Jazz Age by D.J. Taylor
	Louis Mountbatten (1900–1979)	Newspaper articles: Showing Aside the Jazz Set in English Society
	Nadejda Mountbatten (1896–1963)	Newspaper articles: Showing Aside the Jazz Set in English Society
	Herbert Mundin (1898–1939)	Newspaper articles: Eminent Victorians
	Basil Murray (1902–1937)	Books: The Brideshead Generation: Evelyn Waugh and His Friends by Humphrey Carpenter; Fictional characters: Jasper Aspect in Wigs on the Green by Nancy Mitford
	Anna Neagle (1904–1986)	Portraits: 1937, Anthony Wysard (1907–1984)
	Beverley Nichols (1898–1983)	Books: Bright Young People: The Lost Generation of London's Jazz Age by D.J. Taylor
	Harold Nicolson (1886–1968)	Books: Bright Young People: The Lost Generation of London's Jazz Age by D.J. Taylor
	Richard Henry Brinsley Norton (1892–1954)	Portraits: 1931, Anthony Wysard (1907–1984)
	Ivor Novello (1893–1951)	Books: Bright Young People: The Lost Generation of London's Jazz Age by D.J. Taylor
	Serge Obolensky (1890–1978)	Newspaper articles: Amusing Turns Brighten Coming-of-Age Party
	Mark Ogilvy-Grant (1905–1969)	Books: Bright Young People: The Lost Generation of London's Jazz Age by D.J. Taylor; Brian Howard: Portrait of a Failure by Marie-Jaqueline Lancaster; Fictional characters: Sir Ivor King in The Pursuit of Love by Nancy Mitford
	Nina Ogilvy-Grant (1906–1969)	Books: Bright Young People: The Lost Generation of London's Jazz Age by D.J. Taylor; Portraits: 1930, Anthony Wysard (1907–1984)
	Denise Orme (1885–1960)	Newspaper articles: Amusing Turns Brighten Coming-of-Age Party
	George Orwell (1903–1950)	Books: Bright Young People: The Lost Generation of London's Jazz Age by D.J. Taylor; Fictional characters: Erridge (Earl of Warminster) in A Dance to the Music of Time by Anthony Powell
	Frank Pakenham (1905–2001)	Books: Bright Young People: The Lost Generation of London's Jazz Age by D.J. Taylor; Fictional characters: Erridge (Earl of Warminster) in A Dance to the Music of Time by Anthony Powell
	Pansy Pakenham (1904–1999)	Books: Bright Young People: The Lost Generation of London's Jazz Age by D.J. Taylor
	Richard Pares (1902–1958)	Books: Bright Young People: The Lost Generation of London's Jazz Age by D.J. Taylor
	Dorothea Parry (1876–1963)	Books: Bright Young People: The Lost Generation of London's Jazz Age by D.J. Taylor
	Gwen Parry (1878–1959)	Books: Bright Young People: The Lost Generation of London's Jazz Age by D.J. Taylor; Fictional characters: Vile Bodies by Evelyn Waugh
	Bridget Parsons (1907–1972)	Books: Bright Young People: The Lost Generation of London's Jazz Age by D.J. Taylor; Newspaper articles: Amusing Turns Brighten Coming-of-Age Party
	Desmond Parsons (1910–1937)	
	Michael Parsons (1906–1979)	Books: Bright Young People: The Lost Generation of London's Jazz Age by D.J. Taylor; Brian Howard: Portrait of a Failure by Marie-Jaqueline Lancaster; Portraits: 1930, Anthony Wysard (1907–1984)
	Ralph Partridge (1894–1960)	Books: Bright Young People: The Lost Generation of London's Jazz Age by D.J. Taylor
	Kathleen Pelham Burn (1887–1966)	Books: The Book of Beauty by Cecil Beaton
	Roland Penrose (1900–1984)	Books: Bright Young People: The Lost Generation of London's Jazz Age by D.J. Taylor
	Rosamond Pinchot (1904–1938)	Books: The Book of Beauty by Cecil Beaton
	David Plunket Greene (1904–1941)	Books: Bright Young People: The Lost Generation of London's Jazz Age by D.J. Taylor; Brian Howard: Portrait of a Failure by Marie-Jaqueline Lancaster; Script Doctors and Vicious Addicts; Fictional characters: Vile Bodies by Evelyn Waugh
	Olivia Plunket Greene (1907–1958)	Books: Bright Young People: The Lost Generation of London's Jazz Age by D.J. Taylor; Fictional characters: Hon. Agatha Runcible in Vile Bodies by Evelyn Waugh; A Little Learning by Evelyn Waugh
	Richard Plunket Greene (1901–1978)	Books: Bright Young People: The Lost Generation of London's Jazz Age by D.J. Taylor; Fictional characters Vile Bodies by Evelyn Waugh
	Poldowski (1879–1932)	Books: Bright Young People: The Lost Generation of London's Jazz Age by D.J. Taylor
	Arthur Ponsonby (1871–1946)	Books: Bright Young People: The Lost Generation of London's Jazz Age by D.J. Taylor; Newspaper articles: Blackout of the Hon. Elizabeth's Wild 20-year-party Society in London
	Elizabeth Ponsonby (1900–1940)	Books: Bright Young People: The Lost Generation of London's Jazz Age by D.J. Taylor; Newspaper articles: Blackout of the Hon. Elizabeth's Wild 20-year-party Society in London; Mozart Fancy Dress Concert is Picturesque
	Loelia Ponsonby (1902–1993)	Books: Bright Young People: The Lost Generation of London's Jazz Age by D.J. Taylor; Newspaper articles: Amusing Turns Brighten Coming-of-Age Party
	Matthew Ponsonby (1904–1976)	Books: Bright Young People: The Lost Generation of London's Jazz Age by D.J. Taylor
	Lady Bridget Poulett (1912–1975)	Portraits: 1933, Anthony Wysard (1907–1984)
	Anthony Powell (1905–2000)	Books: Bright Young People: The Lost Generation of London's Jazz Age by D.J. Taylor; The Brideshead Generation: Evelyn Waugh and His Friends by Humphrey Carpenter
	Violet Powell (1912–2002)	Fictional characters: Isobel Tolland in A Dance to the Music of Time by Anthony Powell
	John Pratt (1899–1983)	Books: Bright Young People: The Lost Generation of London's Jazz Age by D.J. Taylor; Portraits: 1934, Anthony Wysard (1907–1984)
	Denis Pritt (1887–1972)	Fictional characters: Kenneth Widmerpool in A Dance to the Music of Time by Anthony Powell
	J. B. Priestley (1894–1984)	Books: Bright Young People: The Lost Generation of London's Jazz Age by D.J. Taylor
	Alan Pryce-Jones (1908–2000)	Books: Bright Young People: The Lost Generation of London's Jazz Age by D.J. Taylor; The Brideshead Generation: Evelyn Waugh and His Friends by Humphrey Carpenter
	Peter Quennell (1905–1993)	Books: Bright Young People: The Lost Generation of London's Jazz Age by D.J. Taylor; The Brideshead Generation: Evelyn Waugh and His Friends by Humphrey Carpenter; Fictional characters: Mark Members in A Dance to the Music of Time by Anthony Powell
	Terence Rattigan (1911–1977)	Books: Bright Young People: The Lost Generation of London's Jazz Age by D.J. Taylor
	Maurice Richardson (1907–1978)	Books: Bright Young People: The Lost Generation of London's Jazz Age by D.J. Taylor
	Paul Robeson (1898–1976)	Books: Bright Young People: The Lost Generation of London's Jazz Age by D.J. Taylor
	Peter Rodd (1904–1968)	Books: Bright Young People: The Lost Generation of London's Jazz Age by D.J. Taylor; The Brideshead Generation: Evelyn Waugh and His Friends by Humphrey Carpenter; Fictional characters: Basil Seal in the work of Evelyn Waugh is claimed by the author to have found basis in Peter Rodd. Lady Beech in Pigeon Pie by Nancy Mitford; Christian Talbot in The Pursuit of Love by Nancy Mitford; Newspaper articles: Lord Rennell's Son Engaged
	Oriel Ross (1907–1994)	Books: The Book of Beauty by Cecil Beaton
	John Rothenstein (1901–1992)	Books: Bright Young People: The Lost Generation of London's Jazz Age by D.J. Taylor
	Kennerley Rumford (1870–1957)	Newspaper articles: Amusing Turns Brighten Coming-of-Age Party
	Elizabeth Russell (1899–1986)	Fictional characters: Vile Bodies by Evelyn Waugh
	Gordon Russell (1892–1980)	Books: Bright Young People: The Lost Generation of London's Jazz Age by D.J. Taylor
	Alison Ruthven (1902–1974)	Books: The Book of Beauty by Cecil Beaton; Newspaper articles: Amusing Turns Brighten Coming-of-Age Party
	Peggy Ruthven (1902–1974)	Books: The Book of Beauty by Cecil Beaton; Newspaper articles: Amusing Turns Brighten Coming-of-Age Party
	Edward Sackville-West (1901–1965)	Books: Bright Young People: The Lost Generation of London's Jazz Age by D.J. Taylor; Fictional characters: David Warbeck in The Pursuit of Love by Nancy Mitford
	Vita Sackville-West (1892–1962)	Books: Bright Young People: The Lost Generation of London's Jazz Age by D.J. Taylor
	Siegfried Sassoon (1886–1967)	Books: Bright Young People: The Lost Generation of London's Jazz Age by D.J. Taylor
	Sybil Sassoon	Newspaper articles: Eminent Victorians
	John Seely (1899–1963)	
	Patrick Seely (1905–1966)	Portraits: 1935, Anthony Wysard (1907–1984)
	Alison Settle (1891–1980)	Books: Bright Young People: The Lost Generation of London's Jazz Age by D.J. Taylor
	Norma Shearer (1902–1983)	Books: The Book of Beauty by Cecil Beaton
	Edith Sitwell (1887–1964)	Books: The Book of Beauty by Cecil Beaton; Bright Young People: The Lost Generation of London's Jazz Age by D.J. Taylor; Fictional characters: Lady Harriett Finnian-Shaw in The Apes of God by Wyndham Lewis; Portraits: 1931, Anthony Wysard (1907–1984)
	Georgia Sitwell (1906–1980)	Books: The Book of Beauty by Cecil Beaton; Bright Young People: The Lost Generation of London's Jazz Age by D.J. Taylor
	Osbert Sitwell (1892–1969)	Books: Bright Young People: The Lost Generation of London's Jazz Age by D.J. Taylor; Fictional characters: Lord Osmund Finnian-Shaw in The Apes of God by Wyndham Lewis
	Sacheverell Sitwell (1897–1988)	Books: Bright Young People: The Lost Generation of London's Jazz Age by D.J. Taylor; Fictional characters: Lord Phoebus Finnian-Shaw in The Apes of God by Wyndham Lewis
	Terence Skeffington-Smyth (1905–1936)	
	Barbara Skelton (1916–1996)	Fictional characters: Pamela Flitton in A Dance to the Music of Time by Anthony Powell
	Eleanor Smith (1902–1945)	Books: The Book of Beauty by Cecil Beaton; Bright Young People: The Lost Generation of London's Jazz Age by D.J. Taylor; Newspaper articles: Blackout of the Hon. Elizabeth's Wild 20-year-party Eminent Victorians; Portraits: 1930, Anthony Wysard (1907–1984)
	Pamela Smith (1915–1982)	Books: The Book of Beauty by Cecil Beaton; Newspaper articles: Eminent Victorians
	C. P. Snow (1905–1980)	Fictional characters: J G Quiggin in A Dance to the Music of Time by Anthony Powell
	Oscar Solbert (1885–1958)	Newspaper articles: Bright Young People of the Rising Generation
	Ivor Spencer-Churchill (1898–1956)	Books: Bright Young People: The Lost Generation of London's Jazz Age by D.J. Taylor; Portraits: 1931, Anthony Wysard (1907–1984)
	Stephen Spender (1909–1995)	Books: Bright Young People: The Lost Generation of London's Jazz Age by D.J. Taylor; Fictional characters: Mark Members in A Dance to the Music of Time by Anthony Powell
	Bernard Spilsbury (1877–1947)	Books: Bright Young People: The Lost Generation of London's Jazz Age by D.J. Taylor
	J. C. Squire (1884–1958)	Books: Bright Young People: The Lost Generation of London's Jazz Age by D.J. Taylor
	Jeanne Stourton (1913–1987)	Portraits: 1933, Anthony Wysard (1907–1984)
	Alix Strachey (1892–1973)	Books: Bright Young People: The Lost Generation of London's Jazz Age by D.J. Taylor
	John Strachey (1901–1963)	Books: Bright Young People: The Lost Generation of London's Jazz Age by D.J. Taylor
	Lytton Strachey (1880–1932)	Books: Bright Young People: The Lost Generation of London's Jazz Age by D.J. Taylor; Fictional characters: Matthew Plunkett in The Apes of God by Wyndham Lewis; Cedric Furber in The Self-Condemned by Wyndham Lewis; Newspaper articles: Blackout of the Hon. Elizabeth's Wild 20-year-party Portraits: 1937, Anthony Wysard (1907–1984)
	Lois Sturt (1900–1937)	Newspaper articles: Young People Take Big Treasure Hunt; British Girl Holds Record as Art Model; London Society's Thrilling All-Night Treasure Hunts; Portraits: 1929, Anthony Wysard (1907–1984)
	Napier Sturt (1896–1940)	Newspaper articles: British Girl Holds Record as Art Model
	Eileen Sutherland-Leveson-Gower (1891–1943)	Books: Bright Young People: The Lost Generation of London's Jazz Age by D.J. Taylor; Newspaper articles: Showing Aside the Jazz Set in English Society
	George Sutherland-Leveson-Gower (1888–1963)	Newspaper articles: Showing Aside the Jazz Set in English Society
	John Sutro (1903–1985)	Books: Bright Young People: The Lost Generation of London's Jazz Age by D.J. Taylor; The Brideshead Generation: Evelyn Waugh and His Friends by Humphrey Carpenter; Brian Howard: Portrait of a Failure by Marie-Jaqueline Lancaster
	Christopher Sykes (1907–1986)	Books: Bright Young People: The Lost Generation of London's Jazz Age by D.J. Taylor; The Brideshead Generation: Evelyn Waugh and His Friends by Humphrey Carpenter
	A. J. A. Symons (1900–1941)	Books: Bright Young People: The Lost Generation of London's Jazz Age by D.J. Taylor
	Julian Symons (1912–1994)	Books: Bright Young People: The Lost Generation of London's Jazz Age by D.J. Taylor
	Stephen Tallents (1884–1958)	Books: Bright Young People: The Lost Generation of London's Jazz Age by D.J. Taylor
	Paul Tanqueray (1905–1941)	Books: Bright Young People: The Lost Generation of London's Jazz Age by D.J. Taylor
	A. J. P. Taylor (1906–1990)	Books: Bright Young People: The Lost Generation of London's Jazz Age by D.J. Taylor
	David Tennant (1902–1968)	Books: Bright Young People: The Lost Generation of London's Jazz Age by D.J. Taylor; Newspaper articles: Blackout of the Hon. Elizabeth's Wild 20-year-party Mozart Fancy Dress Concert is Picturesque; Portraits: 1927, Anthony Wysard (1907–1984)
	Stephen Tennant (1906–1987)	Books: Bright Young People: The Lost Generation of London's Jazz Age by D.J. Taylor; Fictional characters: Lord Sebastian Flyte in Brideshead Revisited by Evelyn Waugh
	Ernest Thesiger (1897–1961)	Books: Bright Young People: The Lost Generation of London's Jazz Age by D.J. Taylor
	Henry Thynne (1905–1992)	Books: Brian Howard: Portrait of a Failure by Marie-Jaqueline Lancaster; Portraits: 1940, Anthony Wysard (1907–1984)
	Dorothy Todd (b. 1883)	Books: Bright Young People: The Lost Generation of London's Jazz Age by D.J. Taylor
	Iris Tree (1897–1978)	Books: The Book of Beauty by Cecil Beaton; Bright Young People: The Lost Generation of London's Jazz Age by D.J. Taylor; Newspaper articles: Young People Take Big Treasure Hunt
	Viola Tree (1884–1938)	Books: Bright Young People: The Lost Generation of London's Jazz Age by D.J. Taylor; Newspaper articles: Young People Take Big Treasure Hunt; London Society's Thrilling All-Night Treasure Hunts
	Violet Trefusis (1894–1972)	Fictional characters: Lady Montdore in Love in a Cold Climate by Nancy Mitford
	Clarita de Uriburu (1908–1995)	Books: The Book of Beauty of Cecil Beaton
	Rudolph Valentino (1895–1926)	Books: Bright Young People: The Lost Generation of London's Jazz Age by D.J. Taylor
	Robin Vane-Tempest-Stewart (1902–1955)	Portraits: 1936, Anthony Wysard (1907–1984)
	Carl Van Vechten (1880–1964)	Books: Bright Young People: The Lost Generation of London's Jazz Age by D.J. Taylor
	Consuelo Vanderbilt (1877–1964)	Books: The Book of Beauty by Cecil Beaton
	Hugh Wade (1907–1949)	Books: Bright Young People: The Lost Generation of London's Jazz Age by D.J. Taylor
	Edward Wadsworth (1889–1949)	Books: Bright Young People: The Lost Generation of London's Jazz Age by D.J. Taylor
	William Walton (1902–1983)	Books: Bright Young People: The Lost Generation of London's Jazz Age by D.J. Taylor
	Hugh Walpole (1884–1941)	Books: Bright Young People: The Lost Generation of London's Jazz Age by D.J. Taylor
	Edward Frederick Ward (1907–1987)	Portraits: Anthony Wysard (1907–1984)
	George Ward (1907–1988)	Portraits: Anthony Wysard (1907–1984)
	Barbara Waring (1911–1990)	
	Sylvia Townsend Warner (1893–1978)	
	Peter Watson (1908–1956)	Books: Bright Young People: The Lost Generation of London's Jazz Age by D.J. Taylor
	Alec Waugh (1898–1981)	Books: Bright Young People: The Lost Generation of London's Jazz Age by D.J. Taylor; The Brideshead Generation: Evelyn Waugh and His Friends by Humphrey Carpenter
	Evelyn Waugh (1903–1966)	Books: Bright Young People: The Lost Generation of London's Jazz Age by D.J. Taylor; The Brideshead Generation: Evelyn Waugh and His Friends by Humphrey Carpenter
	Anthony Edward Wolseley Weldon (1902–1971)	Portraits: 1930, Anthony Wysard (1907–1984)
	Peter Wentworth-Fitzwilliam (1910–1948)	Portraits: 1934, Anthony Wysard (1907–1984)
	Rex Whistler (1905–1944)	Books: Bright Young People: The Lost Generation of London's Jazz Age by D.J. Taylor
	Dolly Wilde (1895–1941)	Books: Script Doctors and Vicious Addicts
	Sunday Wilshin (1905–1991)	
	Harold Wilson (1916–1995)	Books: Bright Young People: The Lost Generation of London's Jazz Age by D.J. Taylor
	Alastair Windsor (1914–1943)	Books: Bright Young People: The Lost Generation of London's Jazz Age by D.J. Taylor; Portraits: 1936, Anthony Wysard (1907–1984)
	Prince George, Duke of Kent (1902–1942)	Portraits: 1936, Anthony Wysard (1907–1984)
	Edward, Prince of Wales (1894–1972)	Books: Bright Young People: The Lost Generation of London's Jazz Age by D.J. Taylor; Newspaper articles: Young People Take Big Treasure Hunt; Flaming Youth tries Britain's Patience; London Society's Thrilling All-Night Treasure Hunts
	Frances Wodehouse (1884–1950)	Newspaper articles: Eminent Victorians
	P. G. Wodehouse (1881–1975)	Books: Bright Young People: The Lost Generation of London's Jazz Age by D.J. Taylor
	Anna May Wong (1905–1961)	Books: The Book of Beauty by Cecil Beaton
	Edward Wood (1881–1959)	Books: Bright Young People: The Lost Generation of London's Jazz Age by D.J. Taylor
	Douglas Woodruff (1897–1978)	Books: The Brideshead Generation: Evelyn Waugh and His Friends by Humphrey Carpenter
	Virginia Woolf (1882–1941)	Books: The Book of Beauty by Cecil Beaton; Bright Young People: The Lost Generation of London's Jazz Age by D.J. Taylor; Fictional characters: Mrs Rhoda Hyman in The Roaring Queen by Wyndham Lewis
	Olivia Wyndham (1897–1967)	Books: Bright Young People: The Lost Generation of London's Jazz Age by D.J. Taylor; Script Doctors and Vicious Addicts; Newspaper articles: Mozart Fancy Dress Concert is Picturesque; London Society's Thrilling All-Night Treasure Hunts
	Joan Yarde-Buller (1908–1997)	Newspaper articles: Showing Aside the Jazz Set in English Society; Amusing Turns Brighten Coming-of-Age Party

== Sources ==
- Carpenter, Humphrey (1989). The Brideshead Generation: Evelyn Waugh and His Friends. London: Weidenfeld & Nicolson. ISBN 978-0-29779320-5.
- Green, Martin (1977). Children of the Sun: A Narrative of Decadence in England After 1918. London: Constable. ISBN 978-0-09461430-7.
- Hollis, Christopher (1976). Oxford in the Twenties. London: William Heinemann. ISBN 978-0-434-34531-1.
- Taylor, D.J. (2009). Bright Young People: The Lost Generation of London's Jazz Age. New York: DFarrar, Straus and Giroux. ISBN 978-0374116835. (U.S edition)
  - Taylor, D.J. (2007). Bright Young People: The Rise and Fall of a Generation 1918–1940. London: Chatto & Windus. ISBN 978-0701177546. (British edition)
