= Ostier =

Ostier is a surname. Notable people with the surname include:

- André Ostier, French photographer
- Denis Ostier (born 1993), French actor
