= Terence Skeffington-Smyth =

Terence George Randall Skeffington-Smyth (31 May 1905 - 9 March 1936) was part of the Bright Young Things and was a close friend of Elvira Mullens Barney, main witness at her trial.

== Biography ==
Terence George Randall Skeffington-Smyth was born on 31 May 1905, the son of Lieutenant Colonel Geoffrey Henry Julian Skeffington-Smyth and Violet Frances Monckton-Arundell, daughter of George Monckton-Arundell, 7th Viscount Galway and Vere Gosling. He had two brothers, Captain Noel Edward Vere Fitz-Patrick (b. 1908) and Denys Bryan (b. 1911). His father was the son of Randall Skeffington Smyth and the Hon. Gertrude Fitz-Patrick, daughter of the 1st Lord Castletown. At the death of Bernard FitzPatrick, 2nd Baron Castletown, Colonel Skeffington Smyth took the name and Arms of Fitz-Patrick by deed poll.

Terence Skeffington-Smyth did not work and lived off a large inheritance from his mother, Violet Frances Monckton-Arundell. He divided his time between England and the French Riviera. While in London, he lived at 19 Orchard Street, near Selfridges, but often stayed also at the International Sports Club in Upper Grosvenor Street.

He met his close friend Elvira Mullens Barney in August 1931; at the trial he said "I have seen quite a lot of Mrs. Barney since then. I know her very well indeed, she is a very good friend of mine."

Skeffington-Smyth held a cocktail party on 26 June 1932, and most of the invitations to Barney's dinner party of 30 May were made that night, therefore this is the reason why most of guests at Barney's house seemed to be better acquaintanced with Skeffington-Smyth than Barney. Skeffington-Smythe was not at the dinner party since he was in Paris, and arriving at 7pm joined the group at The Blue Angel before going together to Arthur Jeffress’ home.

After Barney shot Michael Scott Stephen, she called Skeffington-Smyth. She asked him to come over as "something terrible has happened," but he said he could not go.

On 19 December 1934 at St. Margaret's Church Westminster, Terence Skeffington-Smyth married Isobel McLean, the eldest daughter of Loudon McLean.

He died during a world cruise on 9 March 1936. He was staying at the Broadway Mansions Hotel in Shanghai and The Straits Times reported that he died after visiting an opium den.

The Papers of the Monckton-Arundell Family, Viscounts Galway of Serlby Hall, Nottinghamshire, early 13th Century - 1958, at the Nottingham University Library, Department of Manuscripts and Special Collections, include a poem of Terence Skeffington Smyth.
