= Carlton Carriage Company =

English coachbuilder

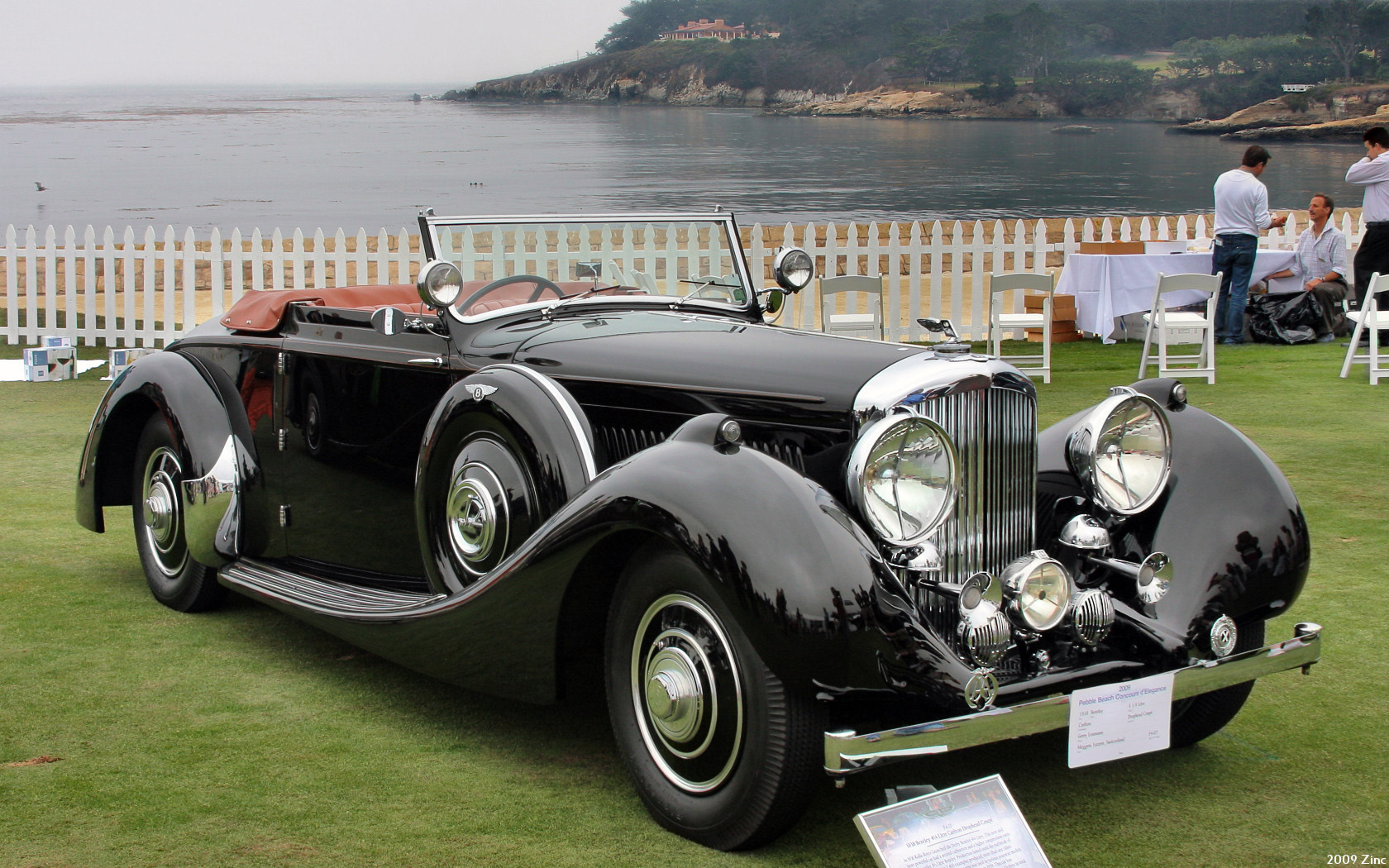
1938 Bentley 4¼ Litre with Carlton Drophead Coupe coachwork. Pebble Beach Concours d'Elegance, 2009

The Carlton Carriage Company was a London coachbuilder that provided bespoke coachwork for some of the finest car makers of the 1920s and 1930s. They are best known for their drophead coupes which are archetypal designs of the British Jazz Era.

== History ==
Carlton Carriage Company was founded in 1924 under the name of the Kelvin Carriage Company and changed its name to Carlton Carriage Co in 1925. The founders had close connections with E&B Hall, Motor Car Industries and the Waverly car company. Carlton began exhibiting at Olympia in 1926.

The firm's business offices were in Shepherd Bush, London and their manufacturing operations were originally located at Waldo Works, Waldo Rd. These later moved to Trenmar Gardens Willesden London NW 10. Albert Victor Halsall and William Pearson Biddle were part of the early & talented design / engineering team. William Biddle went on to found the Corinthian Coachwork company in the late 1930s. Carlton Coach during the 1930s was sought after for their drophead designs especially on Rolls-Royce and Bentley chassis. Their last designer was Cyril James Ingram who among other things specialized in rebodying pre-war Rolls-Royces in the 1950s/60s.

Carlton created bodies for both European and American manufacturers. The main European manufactures for which Carlton provided bodies included: Alfa Romeo, Bentley, Daimler, Delahaye, Hipano-Suiza, Humber, Lancia, Lagonda, Mercedes, MG, Rolls-Royce, Talbot, Vauxhall, Wolseley and Waverly. The main American manufacturers that they created bodies for included: Buick, Chrysler, Essex, Hudson, Oldsmobile, Packard and Pontiac. Carlton also worked as a contract manufacturer for other coachbuilders including Connaught and Offord.

They offered a full range of designs and are best known for their drophead coupe, coupe-de-villes, continental tourer, sport salons and 2-seater sport roadster designs. Some of their more admired designs have a distinctive deco flair. Many of their designs also have elements that are similar to American styles of the period, which could be due to their work with American manufacturers and their American clientele.

Carlton's bespoke coachwork business largely ended by 1939. The company continued coachwork including rebodying pre-war Rolls-Royces until it finally closed in 1965.

== Manufactures and notable cars ==
Bentley – The Carlton Carriage Company produced bodies for both W.O. Bentleys and Derby Bentleys. They built eleven, possibly twelve individual bodies on the "Silent Sports Car" Bentley Chassis between 1934 and 1939 including B55KU, B44MR, B56JD, B203KU and B193GPJ.

Daimler – In 1939, Winston Churchill commissioned Carlton to build a drophead coupe on the Daimler DB18 chassis. Never used until post-World War II, he used it to campaign both the 1944 and 1948 general elections.

Mercedes-Benz – One of the most famous Mercedes-Benz bodied by Carlton is the George Milligen, 1929 Mercedes-Benz 38/250 Model SSK (Chassis 36045) which delighted visitors at the 2009 Pebble Beach Concours d’Elegance. The SSK was known as the faster sports car in the world in the late 1920s.

Rolls-Royce – About 50 bodies were created for Rolls-Royce chassis (2 for the 20 hp, 27 for the 20/25, 3 for the 25/30, 2 for the Phantom I, and 16 for the Phantom II) between 1924 and 1939. Their designs included some of the most archetypal drophead coupes of the period such as 6GX, 32MS, 67GX, 127RY, GBT80, GFT78 and GGA29. The Carlton drophead body was so successful that it was used on nine of the 16 Phantom II chassis. Carlton-bodied Rolls-Royces have won numerous awards and recognition at major auto shows and concours around the world.

Wolseley – 21/60 3 position drop head tourer. One notable example on photographic record is understood to have been commissioned for Lord Nuffield. Only one such example of a Wolseley 21/60 3 position drop head tourer is believed to remain, AGX 653 in which the classic Carlton early 1930s jazz era styling is clearly evident.

== Gallery ==
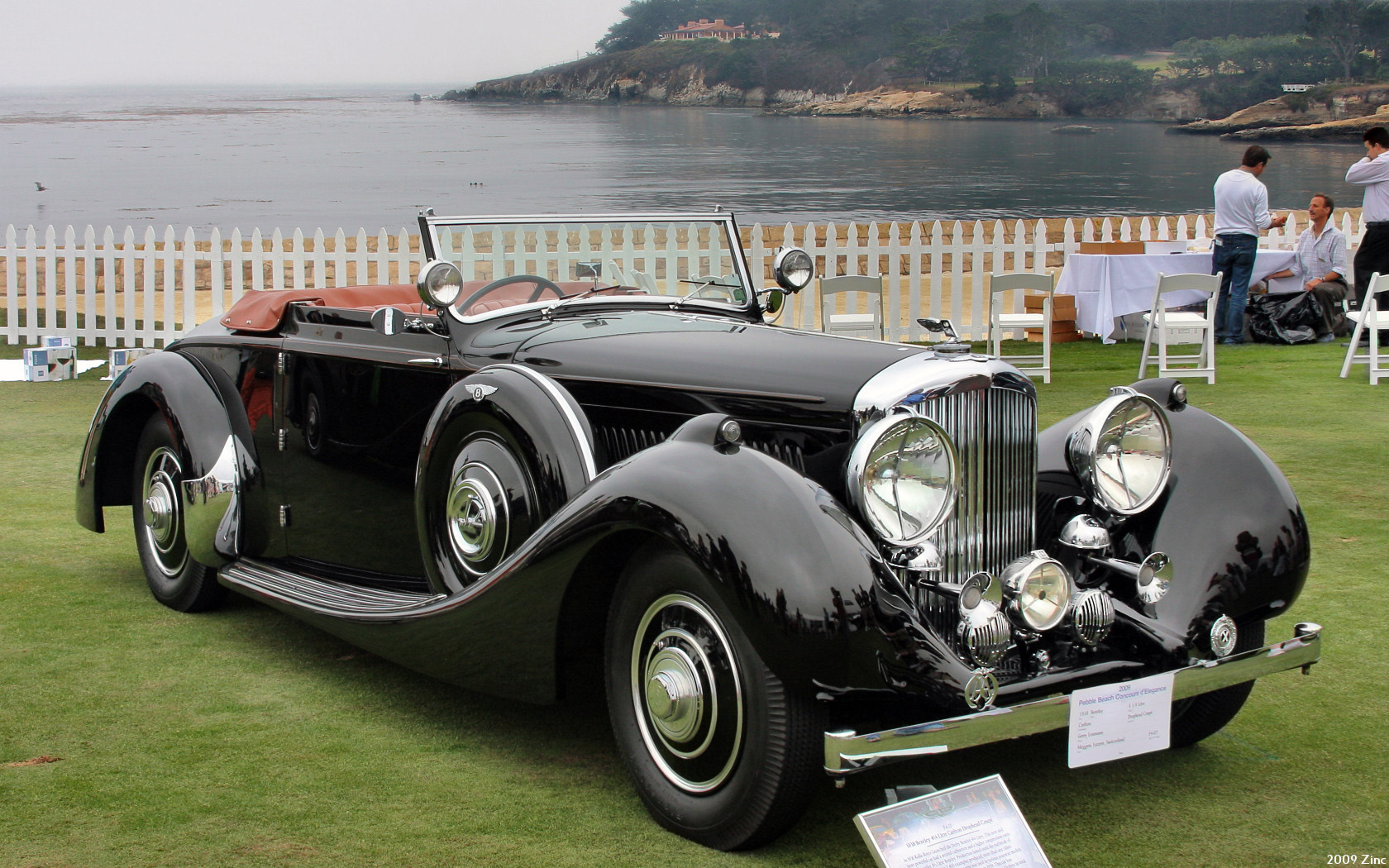
Bentley 4¼ Litre by Carlton

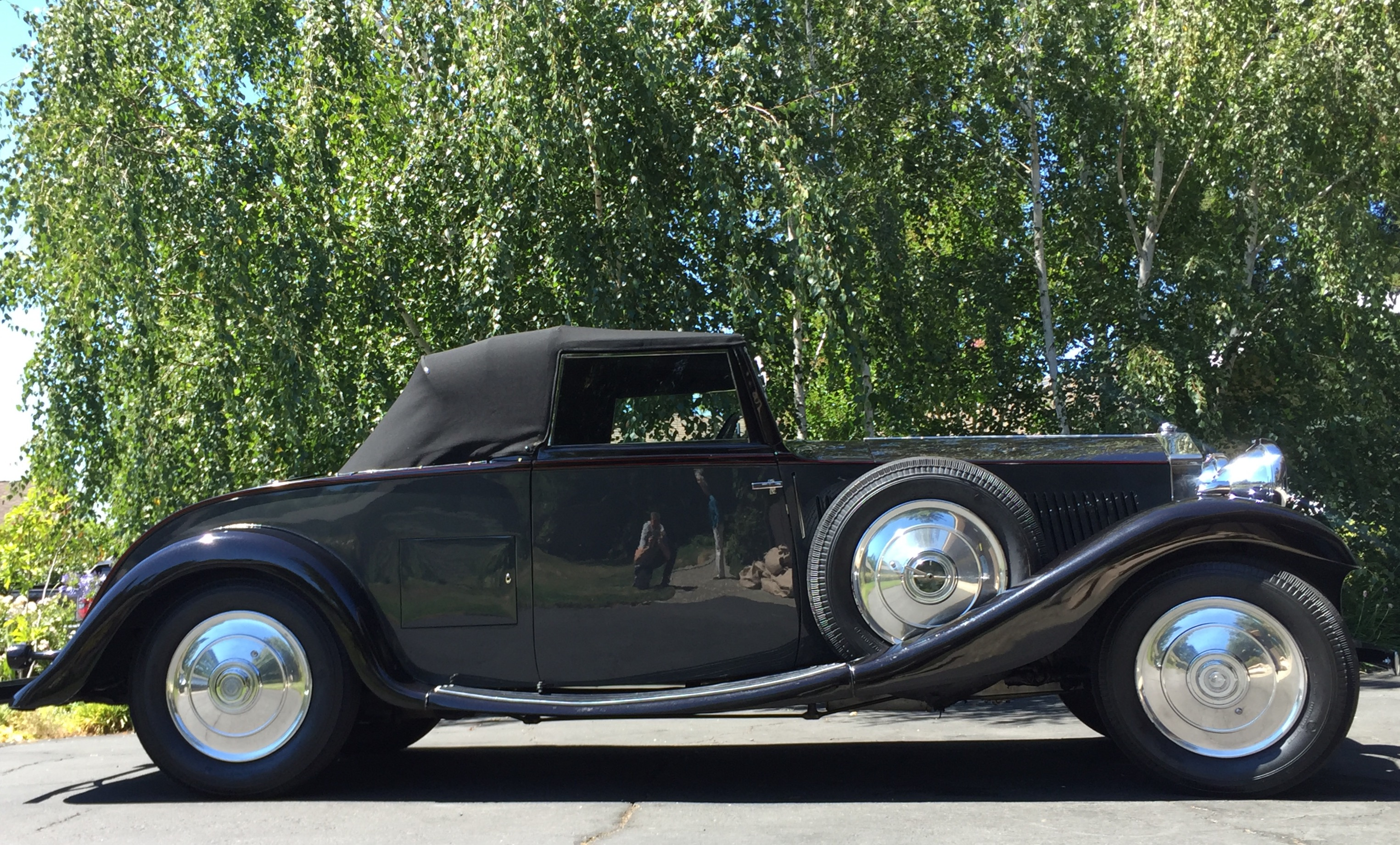
1933 20/25 Rolls-Royce Carlton Drophead Coupé

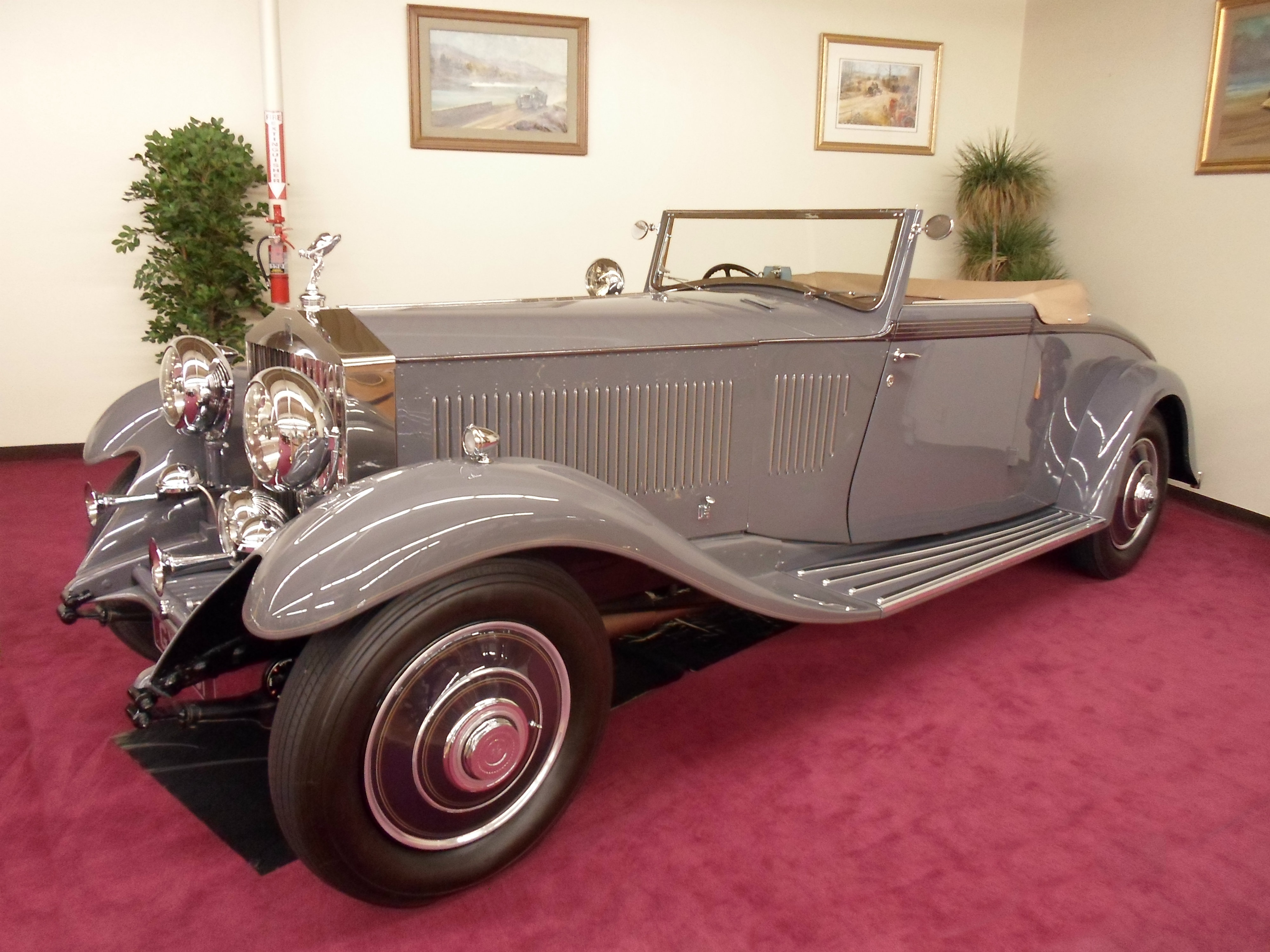
1932 Rolls-Royce Phantom II Carlton Drophead

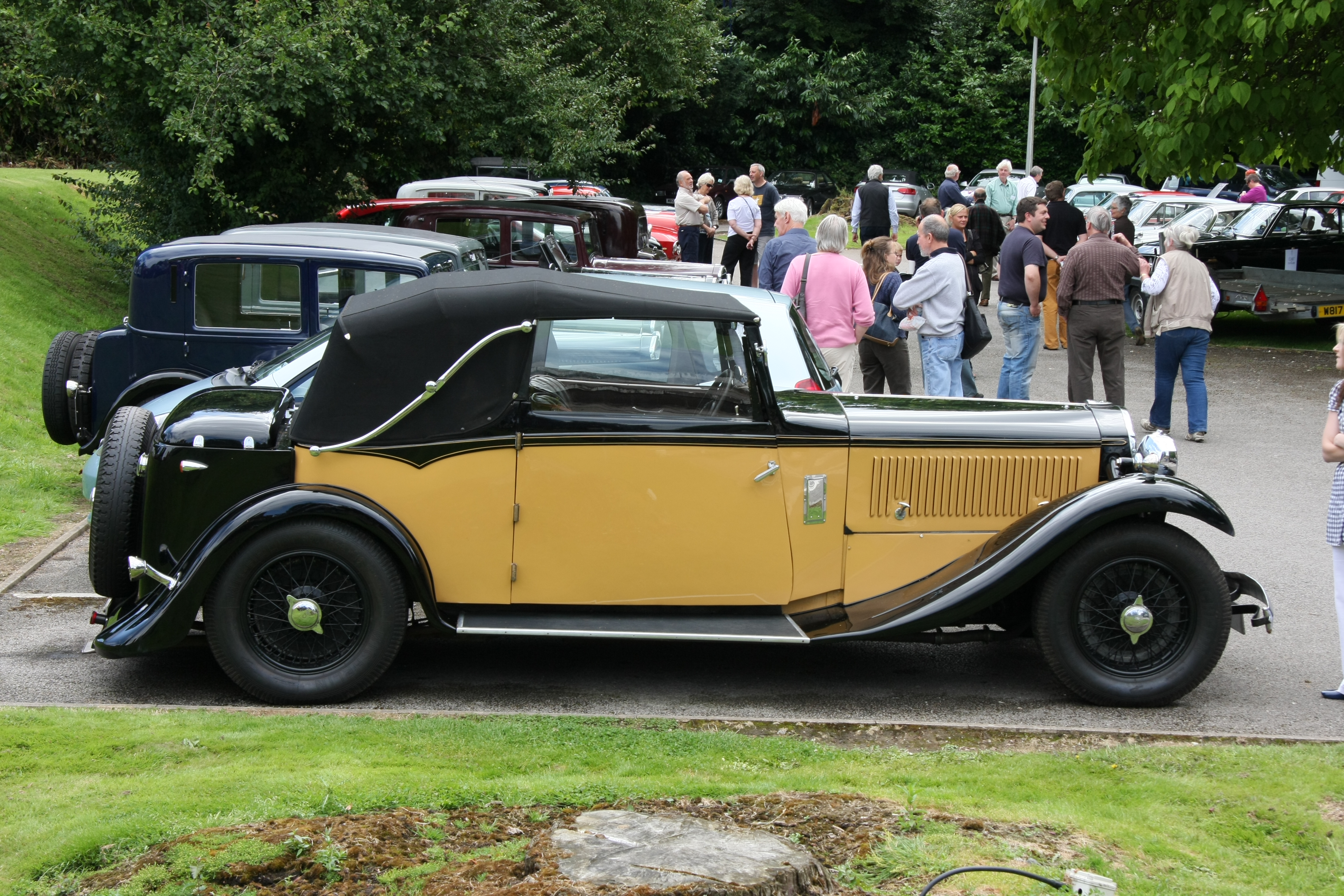
Lancia by Carlton

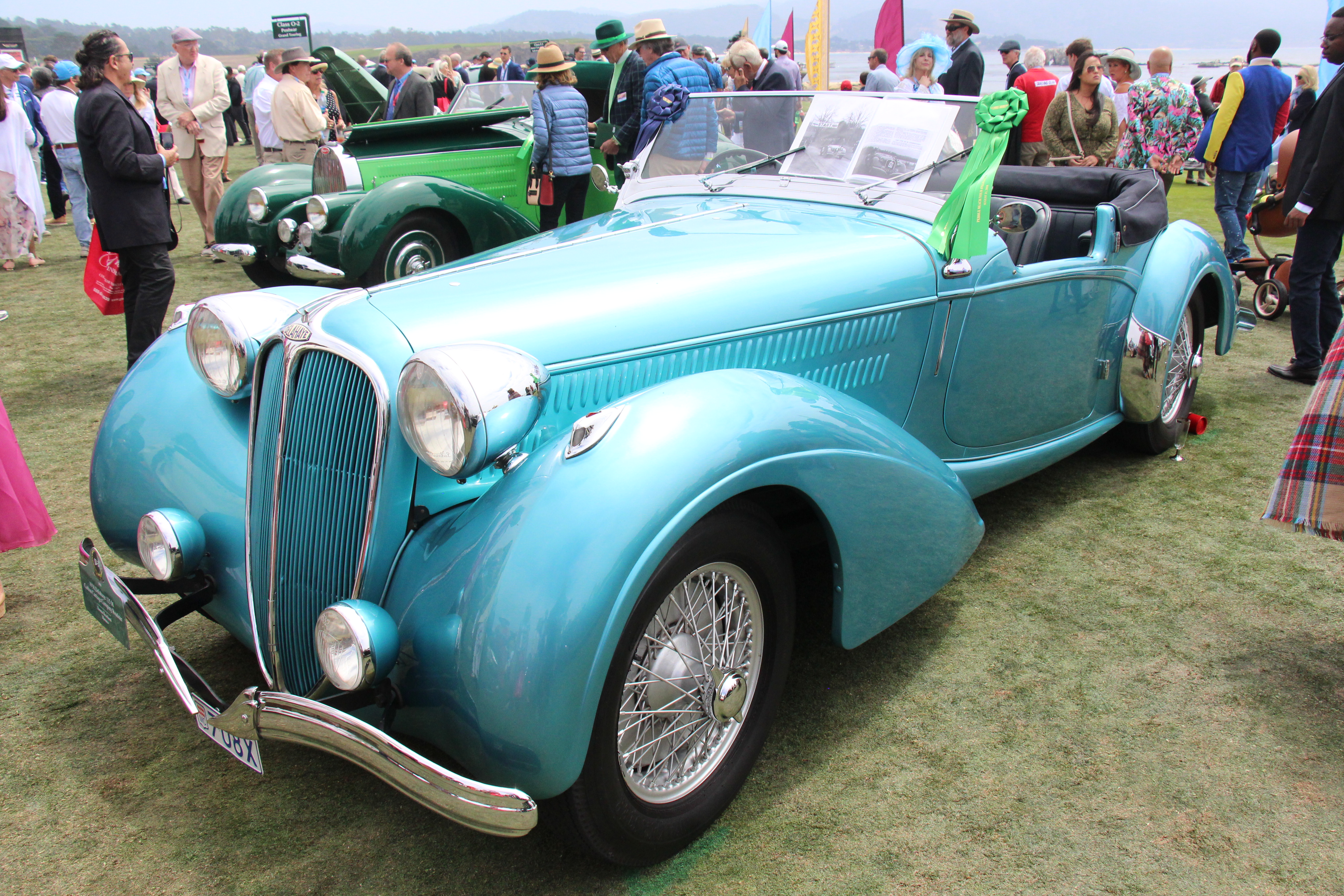
1938 Delahaye 135M Carlton Roadster
