= Ruth Baldwin (socialite) =

English socialite (1905-1937)

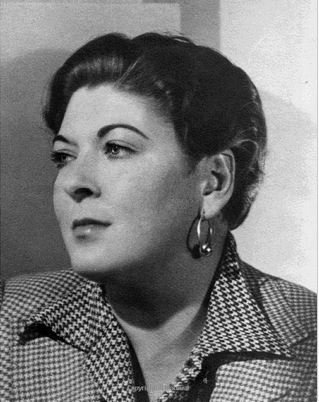
Ruth Baldwin

Catherine Ruth Baldwin (17 February 1905 – 31 August 1937) was an American-born English socialite, part of the Bright Young Things crowd. She was the first important lover of American heiress Joe Carstairs.

== Biography ==
Catherine Ruth Baldwin was born on 17 February 1905 in England. In the 1920s in London, she was known for her use of heroin, cocaine and alcohol. It has been said that she turned the kitchen of the house where she lived with Joe Carstairs into a bar. Carstairs' friends later said, "She was wild. She was such fun. Ruth was really wild." She said to Carstairs, "The world is one's oyster if taken at will." Her circle of friends included painter Edward Burra and society portrait photographers Barbara Ker-Seymer and Olivia Wyndham, the last possibly her lover as well.

When Carstairs purchased her first motorboat, Baldwin gave her a Steiff doll; Carstairs named it Lord Tod Wadley. She became exceptionally attached to this doll, keeping it with her until her death. She had clothes made for it in Savile Row and had its name placed with her own on the name plaque on the door of her London apartment at 5 Mulberry Walk ("Marion Barbara Carstairs and Lord Tod Wadley").

Nina Hamnett took a portrait of Baldwin in Paris.

Baldwin died of a suspected overdose at a Chelsea party at the home of Gwen Farrar on 31 August 1937, while her friends, among them Dolly Wilde, listened to a boxing match in the next room. A photograph of her appeared on The Times on 2 September 1937 announcing her death. She had short hair and a mannish tie, probably alluding to the fact she was lesbian; the article also said she was sharing a house with Carstairs.

Carstairs crossed the Atlantic from Whale Cay aboard the French liner Normandie, the most expensive ship in the world, and took Baldwin's ashes along with her to Whale Cay, where she built a church to house them. When she sold Whale Cay, she removed the ashes. When Carstairs died in Naples, Florida, in 1993 at the age of 93, Lord Tod Wadley was cremated with her. Their ashes and those of Ruth Baldwin were buried in Oakland Cemetery in Sag Harbor, New York.
