= Whaddon House =

Coordinates: 51.5009°N 0.1575°W

Whaddon House is a block of flats in William Mews, Knightsbridge, London, England.

Standing near the east side of Lowndes Square, the building runs north to south, parallel with and between the square and Kinnerton Street.

From early 1964 to 1965, the British pop group The Beatles lived in Flat 7, and also Flat 5 and Flat 6 at some point. From late 1963, their manager Brian Epstein lived there in a top-floor flat, as did Pattie Boyd, who would later marry George Harrison.
