= William Mews =

Street in London, England

Coordinates: 51.5010°N 0.1578°W

William Mews is a mews street in Knightsbridge, London. It is named after William Lowndes of the local landowning Lowndes family.

The street is entered from the north east corner of Lowndes Square and runs parallel to both its east side and Kinnerton Street to the east.

The actress and socialite Elvira Barney lived at no 21, and in May 1932, she and Michael Scott Stephen hosted a dinner party, after which Stephen died of bullet wounds and Barney was arrested and charged with murder, but was found not guilty of murder and manslaughter, only convicted for possession of a firearm.

Whaddon House, a block of flats at 11-18 William Mews was home in the 1960s to The Beatles, Brian Epstein and Pattie Boyd.

The banker and businessman Stephen Catto, 2nd Baron Catto (1923-2001) lived at no 41.
