= Arthur Jeffress =

British collector and art dealer (1905–1981)

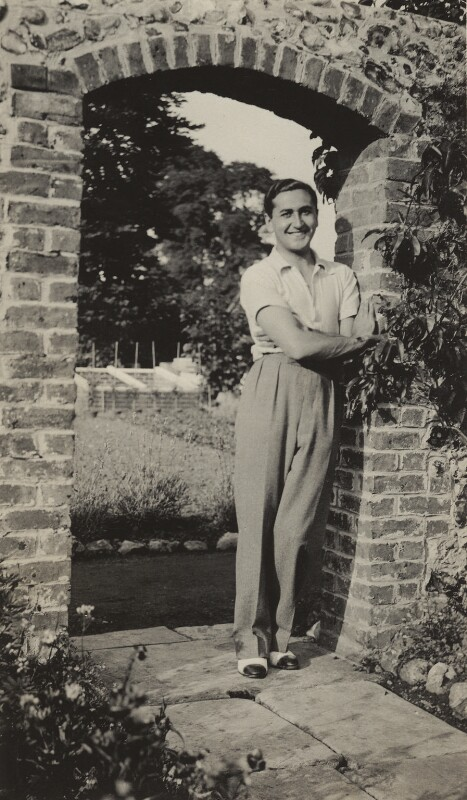
- Jeffress in the 1920s
- Born: Arthur Tilden Jeffress; 21 November 1905; Brentford, Middlesex, England
- Died: 21 September 1961 (aged 55); Paris, France
- Education: Harrow and Cambridge
- Known for: Influential gallery owner, collector and patron of the arts in post war Britain
- Partner: John Deakin (c 1930s)
- Parent(s): Albert & Stella Jeffress
- Relatives: Joseph Randolph Jeffress (brother)

Arthur Tilden Jeffress (21 November 1905 – 21 September 1961) was an influential gallery owner, collector, and patron of the arts in post-World War II Britain. In the 1920s and 1930s he was conspicuous mostly as a rich playboy and socialite. He died in 1961, leaving his art collection to the Tate and Southampton City Art Gallery.

== Early life ==
Arthur was born in Brentford, Middlesex on 21 November 1905, the second son of Albert and Stella Jeffress of Charlotte, Virginia, U.S.A. His older brother, Joseph Randolph Jeffress, was born in 1900.

Albert Jeffress was in the tobacco business and in 1902 helped to form the British American Tobacco (BAT) company, a joint venture between the UK's Imperial Tobacco and The American Tobacco Company. Albert became a director of the company at its formation and later become Deputy Chairman. BAT was headquartered in London and Albert moved his family to England so that he could help run the new company.

The Jeffress family lived at Kenton Grange, a 27-acre estate at Kenton, Middlesex. Arthur was educated at Harrow and Pembroke College, Cambridge.

In 1925, Albert unexpectedly died while returning from a business trip to China. He left the majority of his estate to his wife, two sons and his sister, Anita Jeffress Hill of Berkeley, California. The family continued to live at Kenton Grange until well after the Second World War.

== The Bright Young People/ Things period ==
Jeffress and his brother Randolph were both interested in cars; Randolph, who owned a Bugatti and 1929 Supercharged Alfa Romeo, became an amateur racer. Jeffress's own interest was mainly in automotive aesthetics, leading to his ownership of first a Kissel, then, aged 28, his first Rolls-Royce, a two-seater 20/25 convertible (GGA29) with coachwork by the Carlton Carriage Company. He subsequently acquired another 20/25, GAE80 bodied by Thrupp & Maberly.

After leaving Cambridge, and before the Second World War, Jeffress's enthusiasm for the arts led him to enter artistic social circles; he was an acquaintance of the Sitwells, playing a role in Osbert and Sacheverell's play "First Class Passengers Only" at the Arts Theatre in 1927. The Sitwells' artistic salon at their Carlyle Square home regularly hosted eminent writers, artists, critics and patrons; Jeffress thus came into contact with this world. Jeffress's friend, André Ostier, was at this time running a gallery in Paris; another friend, Henry Clifford, would become head curator of the Philadelphia Museum of Art. With the guidance of these artistically-knowledgeable friends, Jeffress began collecting art by the mid-1930s. At around this time, he bought de Chirico's "The Painter's Family", a Picasso, and a number of other works.

Jeffress was one of the numerous Bright Young People, young bohemian artists, aristocrats, and socialites, during the 1920s and 30s. This group was famous for its dedication to modernism, the arts, and throwing extravagant parties; on 21 November 1931, Jeffress hosted the last great so-called "Monster” balls, the "Red and White Party". This was held at the west wing of Holford House in Regent's Park. This- considered a grand address- was the home of the famous dancer Maud Allan. Although 250 people were invited, four hundred attended. The party's name was reflected in the request that guests dress only in red and white costumes- these included sailor suits, nun's habits, evening dress, sashes, wigs and gloves. The rooms were extravagantly decorated in red velvet and white silk, and the food and drink consisted of red caviar, lobster, salmon, champagne, wine, and gin. Jeffress greeted his guests attired in a white angel-skin sailor suit with red trimmings, a ruby necklace, two diamond clips and a spray of white star orchids. The party continued until dawn, but represented, with the arrival of the depression, the end of the heyday of the Bright Young Things.

During much of the 1930s, Jeffress's boyfriend was John Deakin, an "acid-tongued... wit", later a photographer of Soho in the 1950s who also influenced Arthur's art collecting.

== World War II ==
With the onset of war in Europe, Jeffress became a non-combatant ambulance driver. His childhood enthusiasm for motor vehicles had led him to become a skilled driver and knowledgeable about vehicle maintenance.

Jeffress put his art collection into storage and closed up his house, offering its use to the military. In 1940, he applied to join the American Field Service; and in time he was assigned to its British American Ambulance Corps as a driver. Reporting for duty on 27 January 1941 at the BAAC office in New York, he was assigned to a unit of 24 men; at 34, he was one of the elder members of the unit, the youngest being 19. His unit was assigned to the Middle East and North African Campaigns after one month of training, shipping out on board the SS Zam Zam for Mombasa, Kenya. They were to travel overland to Lake Chad, where they would support de Gaulle's Free French Forces.

The voyage to Africa was undertaken alongside US missionaries and their families, a group of French Canadian Catholic Brothers, and a group of tobacco businessmen. The S.S. Zam Zam, being an Egyptian ship, was neutral in the war, and was taking a "safe" route to avoid more dangerous supply routes; although the US was not at war, the Nazis attacked supply ships heading to Britain. The ship was to sail down to South America before crossing the Atlantic to Africa. However, in the early morning of 17 April, the German raider Atlantis opened fire on the Zam Zam, which, critically disabled, began to sink. With the loss of many lifeboats in the attack, and lack of coordination when abandoning ship, many life boats departed only partially full; most of the BAAC men, including Jeffress, were stranded on the sinking ship. Bernhard Rogge, captain of the Atlantis, observed the number of women and children in the lifeboats and, concluding that the sinking ship had not been an Allied supply ship, sent out boats to rescue the survivors. The German sailors gathered the lifeboats and boarded the "Zam Zam", rescuing all remaining passengers and crew. All passengers and crew members were saved, with only a few injured in the attack. After a few days of captivity, the Atlantis rendezvoused with another German ship, the Dresden; the captured passengers and crew were transferred to this ship, where conditions were difficult- all the men were confined to a cramped space below deck (108 men in a 50x50 ft space), and food was scarce and poor. As a result many became ill. They were kept captive whilst Berlin decided how to deal with the diplomatic situation.

On 20 May, the Dresden came into port at St Jean-de-Luz, in occupied France. The captives were separated into two groups: those who were citizens of countries at war with Germany, and those who were not. The former would be transported to POW camps until the end of the war; the latter placed under house arrest in a small hotel at Biarritz commandeered by the Nazis. The German government contacted the US embassy and the Red Cross and briefed them on the situation. A few weeks later, it was announced that only the BAAC men would remain under house arrest, everyone else handed over to their embassies to be returned home. The status of the BAAC men was a source of uncertainty for Berlin, since, although American, they were in military uniforms and employed by the BAAC. Although the men were fed and kept in contact with the US embassy, they were unsure of their fate; with the US moving toward entering the war, the men assumed that, if they remained captive, at the point the US entered the war they would like the others be transferred to a POW camp. Although on 28 June two of the BAAC men escaped, making their way through occupied territory to Portugal and successfully making it back to the US on the SS Excalibur., the others remained under house arrest. The US and German governments were working on an exchange, as it was clear to both countries that they were approaching war and this was the last chance for an exchange of pre-war captives. In late July the remaining BAAS members were informed of the exchange and were transported to Lisbon where they boarded the USS West Point to be transported back to the US. They arrived in New York on August 1, 1941. All but two of the BAAS arrived safely; two remained due to health issues.

Jeffress stayed in New York to recover for a short while; he was determined to contribute to the Nazi defeat, but given the cessation of BAAC activities, he joined the American Field Service (AFS), again as an ambulance driver. He was shipped out to fulfil the original BAAC objective in North Africa, this time arriving with no interruptions. Jeffress reached the rank of captain, moving with his team through Egypt into Libya and then into Italy, at the forefront of the Allied advance.

== Gallery owner, collector and patron ==
After the war, Jeffress returned to Britain with a revitalized passion for art. In 1947, he and Erica Brausen opened the Hanover Gallery near Hanover Square, London. Brausen had experience with the gallery business, previously worked at the Redfern and other galleries. While she ran the business, Jeffress provided financial backing and gave customers the benefit of his social connections with others in the art world; the two collaborated on the gallery's artistic focus. One of the gallery's earliest artists was Francis Bacon, who held his first solo exhibition there in 1949. Other artists included Graham Sutherland and Lucian Freud. Given their differing tastes in art, their relationship was fractious, with Jeffress often threatening to withdraw his backing. The partnership was brought to an end in 1953; when Brausen happened to mention to the financier Michael Behrens that she was closing the gallery the next day, Behrens bought it from Jeffress. Under Brausen's direction, the gallery remained in operation until 1973, maintaining a strong reputation and link to Bacon- it was considered “one of the most diverse and interesting galleries in Europe.”

In 1954, Jeffress opened his own gallery, "Arthur Jeffress (Pictures)", at 28 Davies Street, London. Jeffress had brought Robert Melville with him from the Hanover Gallery to run this new operation. An influential art critic and journalist, Melville's reputation, combined with that of Jeffress, helped to quickly establish the new gallery in the London art world. Unlike the Hanover Gallery, Arthur Jeffress (Pictures) did not represent individual artists; Jeffress would purchase paintings he and Melville liked from artists, other galleries and auctions, curating them into shows and selling them. Jeffress was an expert marketer of his business, using his extensive social network and personal charm to promote it. He was considered one of the most colourful figures- and his gallery one of the most colourful institutions- in the London art world at this time.

By the late 1950s Jeffress had collected hundreds of pieces of art, although did not consider himself a dedicated expert collector, recognising his idiosyncratic approach. This collection was constantly changing; at various times it included works by Caruso, Chagall, Delacroix, Delft School (painting), Delvaux, Lucian Freud, Modigliani, Matisse, Picasso, Pollock, Rouault, Rousseau, Simbari, Soutine, Sutherland, Weenix, and many others.

== Death ==
Jeffress committed suicide on 21 September 1961 while staying at the Hotel France et Choiseul in Paris. The reasons for his death remain unknown. It was speculated- this speculation being disdained by those closest to Jeffress- that an incident in Venice, where he lived for a few months each year, had distressed him. He employed two handsome young gondoliers to transport him around the city; after one grand dinner party, the Duchess of Windsor asked if Jeffress would take her home in his gondola. Jeffress was however unable to do so because the gondoliers he employed had gone off "carousing". Furious, he fired them, but it is alleged that in revenge they denounced him as a homosexual to the homophobic Venetian authorities, who were endeavouring to purge foreign homosexuals from the city at that time. Jeffress left for Paris. It was speculated that, exposed and exiled from Venice, Jeffress killed himself; In a 3 November 1961 letter from Jeffress's friend Truman Capote to another friend, Cecil Beaton, Capote expressed bewilderment as to the cause of their friend's death and did not consider the Venice incident as a potential reason. Jeffress's friend Robert Melville, who knew him well, stated that “Arthur... came finally to the point of wondering whether the world wanted him or not.”

Jeffress left his art and money to communities he cared about:

- The Tate received two works: the portrait of Emile Bernard by Toulouse Lautrec and André Bauchant’s Funeral Procession of Alexander the Great.
- The Southampton City Art Gallery received 99 works includes works by Lucian Freud, Graham Sutherland, Walter Sickert, David Roberts, Paul Delvaux and many others.
- A substantial sum of money was left to the welfare of "male naval ratings and merchant seamen".
