= Nicola Simbari =

Italian painter (1927–2012)

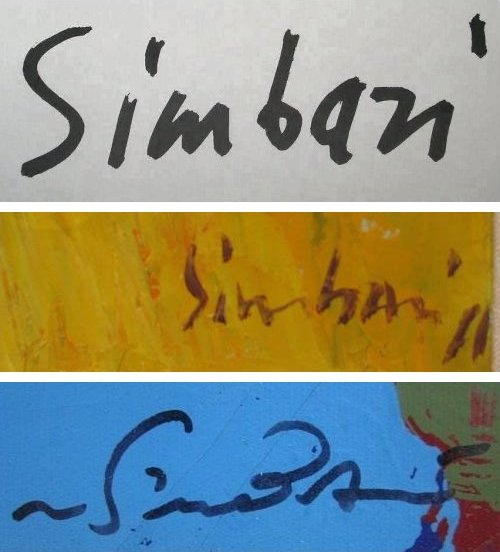
Signature

Nicola Simbari (July 13, 1927 - December 11, 2012) was an Italian painter.

== Life and career ==
Though born in San Lucido, Calabria, Nicola Simbari was raised in Rome, where his father was an architect for the Vatican. He studied at the Accademia di Belle Arti di Roma and in the 1940s he began devoting himself to painting in a studio at Via del Babuino in central Rome. Simbari's early exposure to the architectural world had a lasting impression on his art, as he incorporated geometric forms and architectural structures into almost all of his paintings. He began to develop a distinct style stemming from impressions of life, nature, and the Mediterranean, impressions which abstractly reflect themselves in the purely vivid and passionate colors of his work. Simbari's originality and commercial appeal brought his art to exhibitions in London and New York by the 1950s, solidifying his international reputation.

Simbari was born in Calabria, Italy and this beautiful area greatly impacted his Mediterranean paintings: the blues of the ocean and sky, and the bright hues of the flowers. His family moved to Rome when he was young and his father worked there as a Vatican architect. Rome's art masterpieces so impressed Simbari that, by age 13, he decided to study art and enrolled at the Accademia delle Belle Arti. He opened his first studio in Rome at 22 years of age. Simbari's early works featured scenes from his childhood - gypsies, cafes, fishing villages, and the Italian countryside.

He saw success almost immediately, and shortly after a one-man show in London, he was commissioned to paint murals for the Italian Pavilion at the 1958 World's Fair in Brussels. His show "Le Cirque," reflected the same excitement on his canvases as is felt at an actual circus. The show was highly acclaimed in Paris, New York, Chicago, and Los Angeles. "When I paint, I'm like a writer," Simbari states, "I must have something to say. My paintings are like entries in a diary because they are all reactions to things I have seen or felt."

Mediterranean landscapes and paintings of contemporary European life are usually Simbari's subjects, although he also paints scenes of the Southwest. "There's terrific drama in the desert. It's mysterious and magical, and the most dramatic natural sculpture I've ever seen." Simbari's canvases are filled with color and emotion.

Simbari's works can be found in numerous museums and private and corporate collections around the world. His paintings are in collections including the Bank of Tokyo and the Christian Dior Collection in Paris; Italian State Railways in Rome; Liberty Company in London; and Tulsa Bank of Commerce, Cincinnati Fine Arts Department, Exxon Corporation, General Mills Corporation, and Pepsico, in America.

Major American and English critics have called Simbari "thoroughly disarming"; one who paints "boldly and in a state of excitement"; "whose personal enthusiasm and enormous zest for life have much the same infectious appeal as do his paintings."

Nicola Simbari died on December 11, 2012, in Frascati, Lazio, Italy.
