= Edward Burra =

English painter, draughtsman, and printmaker (1905–1976)

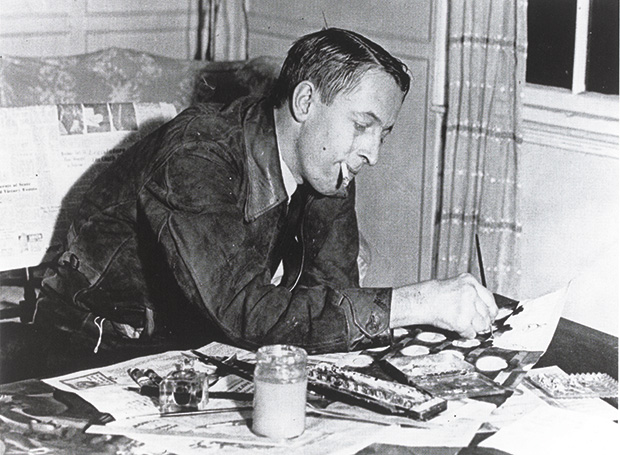
- Born: Edward John Burra; 29 March 1905; South Kensington, London, England
- Died: 22 October 1976 (aged 71); Hastings, East Sussex, England
- Education: Chelsea School of Art; Royal College of Art
- Known for: Painting, drawing

Edward John Burra CBE (29 March 1905 – 22 October 1976) was an English painter, draughtsman, and printmaker, best known for his depictions of the urban underworld, Black culture and the Harlem scene of the 1930s.

== Biography ==
=== Early life ===
Burra was born on 29 March 1905 at his grandmother's house in Elvaston Place, London, to Henry Curteis Burra, J.P., of Springfield Lodge, Rye, East Sussex, and Ermentrude Anne (née Robinson Luxford). His father, of a Westmorland family traceable back to the fourteenth century, was a barrister and later Chairman of East Sussex County Council. Edward attended preparatory school at Northaw Place in Potters Bar but in 1917 suffered from pneumonia and had to be withdrawn from school and home-educated. Burra took art classes with a Miss Bradley in Rye in 1921, then studied at Chelsea School of Art until 1923, and from 1923 to 1925 at the Royal College of Art under drawing tutors Randolph Schwabe and Raymond Coxon.

=== Early career ===
In March 1925, while travelling in Italy, Burra suffered with rheumatic fever. He met Paul Nash in the summer of 1925. Burra visited Paris with his life-long friend William Chappell in October 1925. In 1926, Burra travelled with his family to visit his sister in Florence, Italy, and also visited Siena and Paris. In 1927, he visited Paris with Lucy Norton and Sophie Fedorovitch, who painted his portrait, now lost. Burra was introduced to Oliver Brown of the Leicester Galleries in August 1927; in September–October, Burra and Chappell travelled to the south of France; in December, Burra exhibited at the New English Art Club. Nash offered to teach Burra wood engraving in February 1928; Burra was commissioned by Crawfords to design vehicle advertising signs, which were rejected, in May 1928. Burra visited Toulon with Chappell, Irene Hodgkins, Barbara Ker-Seymer, Brian Howard and Anthony Powell. From October to December 1928, he stayed in Paris with Chappell, Fedorovitch, Frederick Ashton, Cedric Morris, Arthur Lett-Haines, Arthur Mahoney and John Banting. Burra visited dance halls and music halls on the rue de Lappe.

Burra's first solo show was held at the Leicester Galleries in 1929. In May 1929, he visited Paris with Chappell, Ashton, Fedorovitch, Mahoney and Birgit Batholin. His sister Betsy died of meningitis in August 1929. He visited Scotland with his mother in September 1929. In October 1929, Burra exhibited with the London Group; woodblock prints were shown at the Society of Wood-Engravers exhibition at the Redfern Gallery in London. In January 1930, he began to make collages with Paul Nash. Later that year, he travelled with Paul and Margaret Nash to Paris and the South of France. In October 1931, he exhibited in Recent Developments in British Painting, with John Armstrong, Nash, Edward Wadsworth and Ben Nicholson, at Arthur Tooth & Sons in London. Ashton's ballet A Day in a Southern Port (Rio Grande) opened at the Savoy, London in November 1931 with sets and costumes by Burra. He was a member of Unit One in 1933 and showed with the English Surrealists later in the 1930s.

=== Later life ===
Burra travelled widely, and many influences are at play in his works, which were usually watercolour on a large scale in strong colours. During World War Two, when it became impossible to travel, he also became involved in designing scenery and costumes for ballet, opera and theatre including Miracle in the Gorbals and became very successful in that field. His major religious painting, The Mocking of Christ (c.1952), is held by the University of Dundee Museum Services. He declined associate membership of the Royal Academy in 1963, but accepted a CBE in 1971. The Tate Gallery held a retrospective of his work in 1973. In conjunction with the exhibition at Tate, the Arts Council of Great Britain produced a documentary about his life and work, Edward Burra. All the footage of the interview with Burra conducted for this film was assembled into a documentary in 1981, The Burra Interview, in which he avers that "Nothing matters" and praises Yorkshire because "it's nice and bare".

=== Death ===
After breaking his hip in 1974, his health declined sharply and he died in Hastings, East Sussex, in 1976. The Tate Gallery Archive holds considerable materials relating to Burra, including his letters.

== Legacy ==
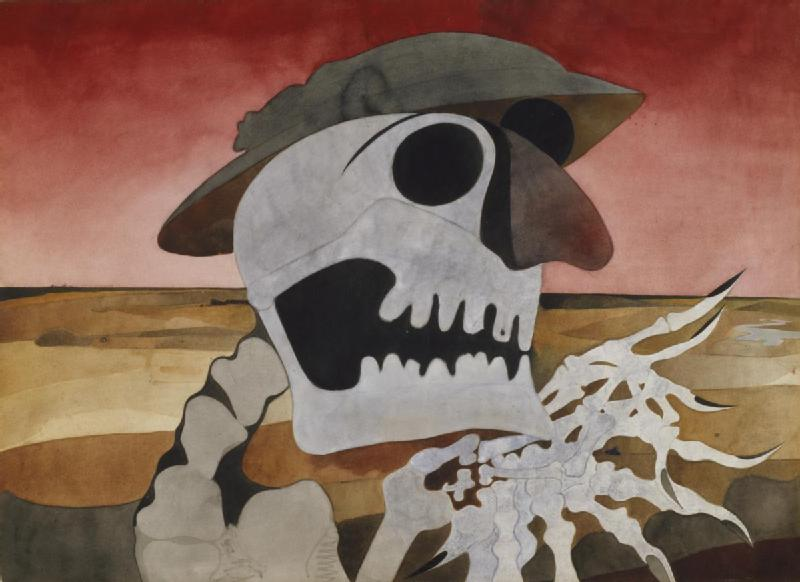
Skull in a Landscape, (1946) (Art.IWM ART 15554)

In the 1980s, Burra's paintings were used on the covers of Allison and Busby reprints of the "Harlem Cycle" novels of Chester Himes.

At the Sotheby's Evill/Frost sale in June 2011, Burra’s Zoot Suits sold for £2,057,250, breaking a record set for the artist earlier in the evening when The Common Stair, from 1929, sold for £881,250.

The first major museum exhibition of Burra's work for more than 25 years was held at Pallant House Gallery in Chichester, West Sussex, from 22 October 2011 to 19 February 2012. It was accompanied by a new monograph on the artist by the curator, Simon Martin.

On 24 October 2011, the BBC aired an hour-long documentary, I Never Tell Anybody Anything: The Life and Art of Edward Burra, in which the art critic Andrew Graham-Dixon chronicled the life of Burra. The documentary follows Burra from his native Rye to the Paris nightlife spots he loved and the jazz clubs of prohibition-era New York and the war-torn landscapes of the Spanish Civil War and back to England during the Blitz. It shows how Burra's increasingly disturbing and surreal work deepened and matured as he experienced at first hand some of the most tragic events of the century. Through letters and interviews with those who knew him, it presents a portrait of a highly unusual and gifted British artist.

Tate Britain opened a retrospective exhibition of Burra's works in 2025. The show's curator described Burra as "one of the great known unknowns of modern British art".

== Exhibitions ==
=== Solo exhibitions ===
- 1929, April – Leicester Galleries, London
- 1932, May – Leicester Galleries, London
- 1937, May – Springfield Museum of Art, Massachusetts, USA
- 1942, November – Redfern Gallery, London
- 1947, June – Leicester Galleries, London
- 1949, July – Leicester Galleries, London
- 1955, January – Magdalene Sothmann Gallery, Amsterdam, Netherlands (Retrospective)
- 1955, April – Swetzoff Gallery, Boston, USA
- 1956, October – Museum of Art, Rhode Island School of Design, Providence, USA
- 1971, July – Treadwell Gallery, London (Woodcuts 1928-9)
- 1971, October – Hamet Gallery, London (Drawings of 1920s and 1930s)
- 1973, May – Tate Gallery, London (Retrospective)
- 1977, May – Lefevre Gallery, London (Memorial Retrospective Exhibition)
- 1977, October – Towner Art Gallery, Eastbourne, and tour to Mappin Art Gallery, Sheffield, and Sunderland Public Library
- 1980, March – Lefevre Gallery, London
- 1980, April – Anthony D'Offay, London (Early Works)
- 1982, April – Lefevre Gallery, London (Paintings 1975-6)
- 1985, August – Hayward Gallery, London, and subsequent tour
- 1986 – Maria Henderson Gallery, London (Designs for the Stage)
- 1987, November – Lefevre Gallery, London
- 1993, June – Lefevre Gallery, London (Drawings from the 1920s and 1930s)
- 1994, December – Lefevre Gallery, London (The Formative Years)
- 2001, February – Spring Olympia Fine Art & Antiques Fair, London
- 2003, January – James Hyman Fine Art, London (Edward Burra: Stage and Cabaret)
- 2005, April – James Hyman Fine Art, London (Edward Burra: Real and Surreal)
- 2005 – Lefevre Gallery, London (A Centenary Exhibition)
- 2008, January – Tate Britain, London (Selection of Harlem Pictures)
- 2011, October – Pallant House Gallery, Chichester, and subsequent tour to Djangoly Art Gallery, University of Nottingham
- 2025, June – Tate Britain, London

In addition, from 1950 until his death, Burra held a show every two years at the Lefevre Gallery.

=== Principal group exhibitions ===
- 1927, December – New English Art Club, London
- 1929, October – London Group, London
- 1931, October – Recent Developments in British Painting, Arthur Tooth & Sons, London
- 1932 – British Art, Hamburg Kunstverein
- 1933, October – Art Now – Mayor Gallery, London
- 1934, April – Unit One – Mayor Gallery, London and provincial tour
- 1935 – Exposition international d'Art Modern – Brussels, Belgium
- 1936, June – International Surrealist Exhibition, New Burlington Galleries, London
- 1936, December – Fantastic Art, Dada and Surrealism, Museum of Modern Art, New York, USA
- 1937, May – Unity of Artists for Peace, Democracy and Cultural Development, Artists International Association, London
- 1938, January – Exposition internationale du Surréalisme, Galerie des Beaux-Arts, Paris, France
- 1939, July – British Painters, New York World's Fair, USA, and North American Tour
- 1940, June – Surrealism Today, Zwemmer Gallery, London
- 1951, May – Sixty Paintings for '51, Arts Council (Festival of Britain), London
- 1957, October – Contemporary British Art, Paris, France
- 1959, November – Three Contemporary English Artists (with Derrick Greaves and Hubert Dalwood), Whitworth Art Gallery, Manchester
- 1965 – The English Eye, Marlborough-Gerson Gallery, New York, USA, London
- 1978, January – Dada and Surrealism Reviewed, Hayward Gallery, London
- 1982, February – A Sense of Place: Edward Burra and Paul Nash, Grey Art Gallery, New York, USA
- 1987 – British Art in the Twentieth Century, Royal Academy of Art, London
- 1997 – Rhapsodies in Black: Art of the Harlem Renaissance, Hayward Gallery, London
- 2001, February – Watercolour, Tate Britain, London

== Ballet, opera and theatre productions designed by Burra ==
- A Day in a Southern Port (Rio Grande), Camargo Society, Savoy Theatre, London, 29 November 1931
- Barbarau, Vic-Wells Ballet, Sadler's Wells Theatre, London, 17 April 1936
- Miracle in the Gorbals, Sadler's Wells Ball, Princes Theatre, London, 26 October 1944
- Carmen, Royal Opera House, Covent Garden, London, 14 January 1947
- Don Juan, Sadler's Wells Ballet, Royal Opera House, Covent Garden, London, 25 November 1948
- Don Quixote, Sadler's Wells Ballet, Royal Opera House, Covent Garden, London, 20 February 1950
- Canterbury Prologue (the ballet was previewed under the title Surprise Ballet, Royal Hall, Harrogate, 19 July 1951), Ballet Rambert, Marlowe Theatre, Canterbury, 30 July 1951; King's Theatre, Hammersmith, London, 15 October 1951
- Simply Heavenly, Adelphi Theatre, London, 20 May 1958

== Books illustrated by Burra ==
- Lee, Laurie, The Voyage of Magellan: A Dramatic Chronicle for Radio, London: John Lehmann Ltd, 1948
- The Oxford Illustrated Old Testament: With Drawings by Contemporary Artists. Authorized King James Version of 1611, London: Oxford University Press, 1968 (Burra illustrated "The Book of Judith")
- Poe, Edgar Allan, The Tell-Tale Heart, London: John Lehmann Ltd, 1948
- Ramuz, C. F., The Triumph of Death, London: Routledge, 1946
- Twain, Mark, The Adventures of Huckleberry Finn, London: Paul Elek (Camden Classics), 1948
- Wolfe, Humbert, ABC of the Theatre, London: Cresset Press, 1932
