= Anton Altmann =

Austrian painter (1808–1871)

Anton Altmann (4 June 1808 – 9 July 1871) was an Austrian landscape painter.

== Life ==
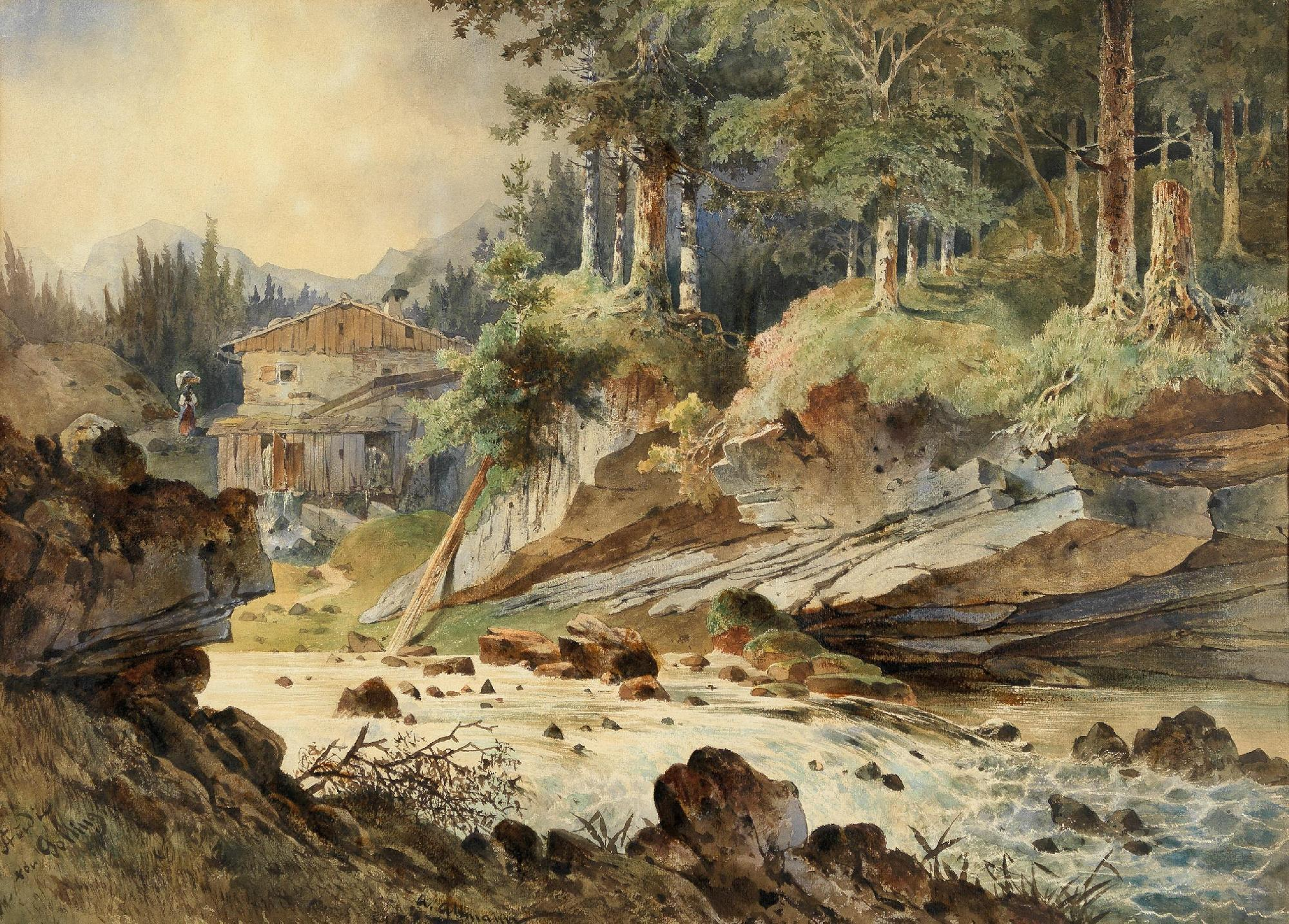
Watercolour landscape by Altmann

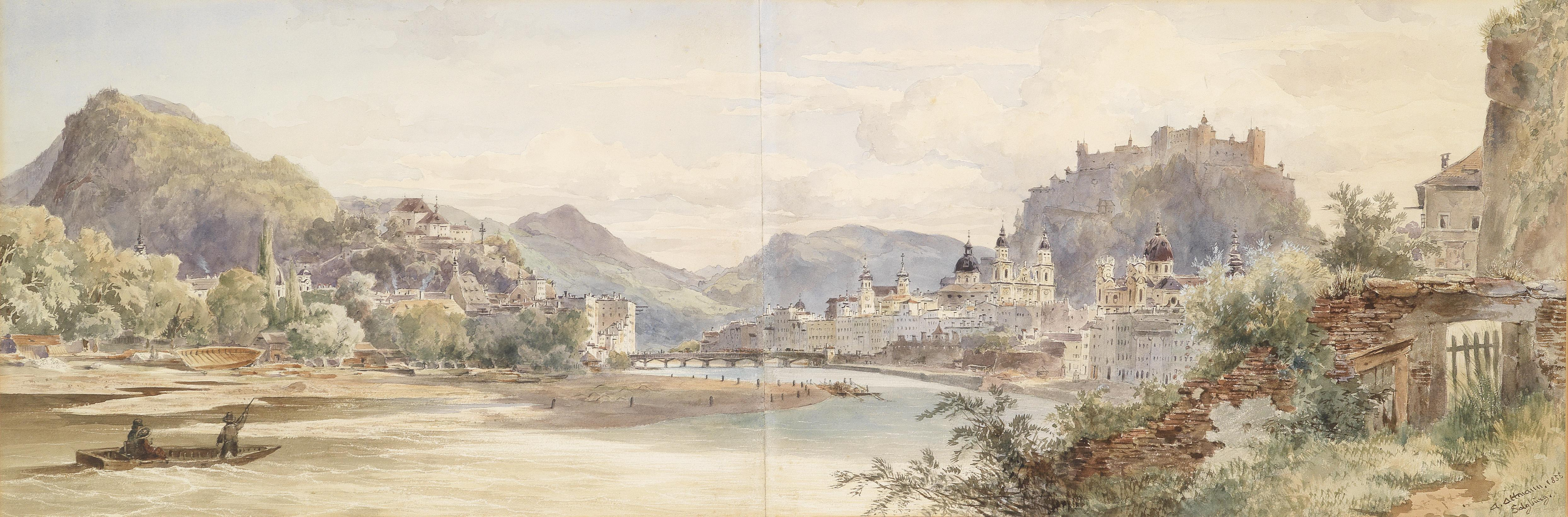
Watercolour panorama of Salzburg, painted in 1855

Altmann, was born in Vienna on 4 June 1808. His father, also called Anton, and his grandfather Joseph were both painters. He studied from nature, and under the instruction of Mössmer at the Academy. After being instructor in drawing to Count Apponyi in Hungary, he settled in Vienna, and became famous as a landscape painter. He died there in 1871.

== Works ==
Among his most important works are the following:

- Cloister of the Convent 'Maria Schein,' in Bohemia. 1838.
- Forest Scene. 1840.
- Marshy Landscape. 1846.
- Evening Landscape. 1847.
- Spring In a Forest. 1851.
- The Mill. 1851.

Altmann executed landscapes in water-colour; and also etched from his own designs.
