= André Ostier =

French photographer

André Ostier (1906 –1994) was a French photographer known for his artists' portraits and photo reports on "La Vie Parisienne".

Joan Miró 1954 by André Ostier

== Biography ==
Born into a middle-class Parisian family, Ostier began his career as a bookseller ("À La Page") and then as a journalist before becoming a photographer. He took a series of portraits of artists and fashion photos published in the pre-war illustrated press. He travelled extensively, visiting India, China, Thailand, North Africa, and across Europe, took pictures during his trips, and led an intense social life in the world of art and culture.

At the beginning of the war, after a first exhibition in 1940, he worked in the south of France, photographing actors (Micheline Presles, Pierre Jourdan, and others), and painters (Henri Matisse, Aristide Maillol, Pierre Bonnard, and others). In Paris, he photographed the occupied city as well as the Château de Versailles with its sandbagged sculptures, images that inspired Paul Éluard when they were published in Vogue Français in 1945.

Arrested for acts of resistance in 1944,Ostier was incarcerated in the Santé prison (he was of Jewish origin), he was freed when General Leclerc's troops entered Paris. He then followed and photographed the troops in the Alsace campaign, taking several portraits of André Malraux.

After the war, his reputation was already well established, and he became friends with Christian Dior and Jacques Fath, whose new-look creations he photographed. He later photographed Yves Saint-Laurent, Pierre Cardin, Coco Chanel, and Marcel Rochas. His major work includes numerous photographic testimonies related to sociological, intellectual, and artistic periods of the 20th century. He died in January 1994.

== Portraits ==
He captured the creative spirit and environment of painters such as Pierre Bonnard, Henri Matisse, Joan Miró, Pablo Picasso, Fernand Léger, Marc Chagall, Francis Bacon, David Hockney, etc.; writers such as Simone de Beauvoir, Jean Cocteau, Truman Capote, Jean Genet, Paul Valéry and Tennessee Williams; and fashion designers Coco Chanel, Christian Dior and Yves Saint Laurent.

== Parties ==
He also immortalized the grand parties of the 1950s and 1960s, where masks and costumes frequently heightened the festive atmosphere. Subjects included the Duke and Duchess of Windsor, Marie-Laure de Noailles, Carlos de Beistegui, Jacqueline de Ribes, Barbara Hutton.

== Exhibitions ==
=== Solo exhibitions ===
- June 13 - September 1, 2019: André Ostier, Portraits of artists, Musée Matisse de la Ville de Nice.
- May 18 - July 28, 2006 : André Ostier, Photographs, Yves Saint-Laurent Museum in Paris7.
- 1989 : Masks and Bergamasks, Galveston Arts Center in Houston.
- 1988 : Masques and Bergamasques, FIAF French Institute/Alliance Française de New York.
- August 17 - September 23, 1993 : André Ostier Photographs - Colette's time, Association Arcade Colette in Paris.
- November 4, 1982 - January 9, 1983 : André Ostier. Photographs of painters and sculptors 1941-1982 [Mois de la photo], Musée Bourdelle in Paris8.
- July 30 - August 11, 1988: Photographs André Ostier, French Cultural Center of Tangier.
- 16–30 May 1957 : Images of Mount Athos, Connaissance du Monde in Paris.

=== Collective exhibitions ===
- January 27 - March 28, 1993 : TANGER - Regards Choisis, Institut du Monde Arabe.
- 5–26 June 1991 : Hommage à Bettina - Photographie de mode 1945–1955, Institut International de la mode à Marseille.
- October 12 - December 2, 1989 : Jean Cocteau The Mirror and the Mask : A Photo-Biography, Lieberman and Saul Gallery in New-York
