= Barbara Ker-Seymer =

British photographer (1905–1993)

- by Humphrey Spender, 1930s
- Born: Barbara Marcia Ker-Seymer; 20 January 1905; Kensington, London, England
- Died: 25 May 1993 (aged 88); Islington, London, England
- Education: Chelsea College of Arts Royal College of Art Slade School of Fine Art
- Occupation: Photographer
- Known for: One of the Bright Young People

Barbara Marcia Ker-Seymer (20 January 1905 – 25 May 1993) was a British society figure and modernist photographer of the interwar period. Associated in her youth with what a contemporary writer described as the "less presentable basement members" of the Bright Young Things, Ker-Seymer established herself as an independent photographer during the 1930s, opening studios in Chelsea and Mayfair and working for Harper's Bazaar and Town & Country.

Although known predominantly for her sharply focussed, lightly retouched, and precise portraits of influential artists, writers, politicians, dancers and society personalities, which led her to be termed a "sharply radical portraitist of the new English avant-garde", her broader practice encompassed editorial commissions, fashion photography and commercial advertising.

Following the Second World War, she abandoned professional photography and established a chain of self-service laundries in Pimlico, London, trading as Westminster Launderettes.

== Early life ==
Born in Kensington, London, Ker-Seymer was the second daughter of Horace Vere Clay Ker-Seymer (also known as Clay-Ker-Seymer), the son of Harry Ernest Clay, who was himself the son of politician James Clay and brother of the composer Frederic Clay; (for inheritance purposes his mother's surname of Ker-Seymer was appended), of a landed gentry family of Hanford, Dorset and Diana, the third daughter of Walter Pennington Creyke (1828-1892), of Seamore Place, Park Lane, and Caroline (1844-1946), a writer known as "Diane Chasseresse" and daughter of the agricultural scientist and entrepreneur Sir John Bennet Lawes, 1st Baronet. Ker-Seymer had an older sister, Manon Diana Ker-Seymer (1903–1970), and a younger sister Pauline, who was born in 1906 but died the following year.

After her father gambled away her mother's inheritance, the family moved from Knightsbridge to West Kensington, where Ker-Seymer lived with her mother and older sister, while her father resided predominantly at the Queen's Club. Although her mother considered the family to be "poor", at least in comparison with the circumstances in which she herself had been brought up, Ker-Seymer attended St Paul's Girls' School and was presented at court as a debutante, expensively attired and wearing the customary ostrich feathers, alongside Meraud Guinness.

From 1922 to 1927, Ker-Seymer studied a range of artistic disciplines. In 1922, she enrolled at Chelsea Polytechnic (formerly the South-Western Polytechnic and later the Chelsea School of Art), where she studied lithography, printing and drawing. In 1924, she attended the Royal College of Art, where she studied under Paul Nash and then in 1927, she studied painting at the Slade School of Fine Art under Henry Tonks.

== Photographic Career ==
After leaving the Slade School of Fine Art, Ker-Seymer met the society photographer Olivia Wyndham, who, in 1929, employed her as an assistant. Although her duties were secretarial, she soon started to assisit Wyndham in taking photographs at Bright Young Things parties, developing the prints overnight and then delivering them to magazines such as The Bystander, The Tatler and The Sketch. When Wyndham visited New York in October 1929, initially intending to stay for a month, Ker-Seymer took over her studio space and became a "photographer by accident", teaching herself the technical aspects of the medium.

During the 1930s, Ker-Seymer ran two portrait studios. The first was at 19 King's Road, London, which she took over from Olivia Wyndham in late 1929. The second was at 15a Grafton Street, which she opened in 1932.

At King's Road, she took professional portraits of politicians such as Sir Oswald Mosley and John Strachey; actors Tony Bruce and Elsa Lanchester; ballet dancers William Chappell (dancer) and Frederick Ashton; and the political activist and publisher Nancy Cunard. She also began experimenting with avant-garde techniques, including double exposure, negative portraits and solarisation, incorporated Surrealist ideas such as symbolism into her work, and used domestic objects and industrial materials as photographic backdrops, including tiger rugs and corrugated metal sheets. Incorporating these reflected her interest in, and influense from, Neues Sehen (New Vision) and New Objectivity (New Objectivity).

This experimentation earned her an invitation to exhibit in the exhibition 27 Photographers at Wertheim Gallery, Burlington Gardens during the summer of 1932, alongside other notable modern photographers including Man Ray, László Moholy-Nagy, Herbert Bayer and Albert Renger-Patzsch.

King's Road also saw the production of portraits jointly attributed to Barbara Ker-Seymer and John Banting, including those of Alix Strachey and James Vincent Sheean.

At the end of 1931, she was commissioned by William Randolph Hearst for Harper's Bazaar to photograph "snaps" of British society at work, rest and play, producing monthly photo stories of society figures at the latest bars, cinema clubs and shops. These included the editorials London Conversation: Wit and Wisdom With Luncheon, Cocktails and Music and Society Goes A-Snacking. At the same time, her studio portraits were also reproduced in Hearst's Town & Country to accompany editorials on newly published books by Curtis Patterson. Her photographs also appeared in The Sketch, The Bystander, Vanity Fair and Vogue.

In 1932, she moved her studio to 15a Grafton Street, situated on the top floor above Asprey, the jewellers, just off New Bond Street. The commercial studio, whose walls were decorated with Surrealist murals by John Banting, allowed Ker-Seymer to expand her business. Here, her main work continued to be portraiture, particularly headshots of society and cultural figures; including ones of the actor Beatrix Lehmann and her author sister Rosamond Lehmann; the authors William Plomer, Randolph Churchill, Evelyn Waugh and Stephen Spender; the ballerinas Kyra Nijinsky and Margot Fonteyn; and the artists Henry Lamb and Humphrey Spender.

When her commissions for Hearst's magazines ended in late 1933, Ker-Seymer expanded her repertoire to include fashion. She initially undertook fashion assignments for Harper's Bazaar and its editor the Hon. Mrs James Rodney (nee Frances Oldham) and then, around 1935, gained employment with the advertising agency Colman, Prentis and Varley. Her work now included advertising commissions for companies such as Elizabeth Arden, Jaeger and Kathleen Court. Ker-Seymer also expanded her studio portraiture to include newly married couples, children and family groups.

During 1937, Gerti Deutsch shared her studio for a short period while establishing herself in England after emigrating from Vienna.

In 1940, as the Blitz unfolded over London, Ker-Seymer closed her studio and moved to the outskirts of Reading. She returned to London in 1942 and took up employment with Larkins & Company (also known as Larkins Studio), a stop-motion film company producing promotional and training films for the general public and military. She left the company just prior to the birth of her son, Max, in 1947.

== Personal life ==
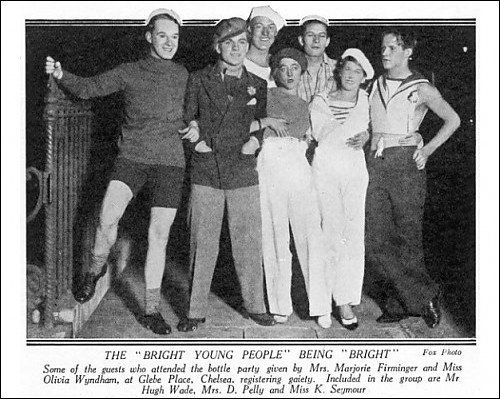
Barbara Ker-Seymer (2nd R) outside Marjorie Firminger and Olivia Wyndham's party at Glebe Place

Ker-Seymer was, what would now be considered, bisexual, having relationships with both men and women throughout her life. Her first significant relationship was with Olivia Wyndham, whom she met in 1928. The, during the summer of 1930 after Wyndham had moved to America, she met Marty Mann, an American writer who worked for Hearst's Town & Country magazine, writing articles about new art exhibitions in New York.

During the 1930s, Ker-Seymer had relationships with Stephen Tomlin, David "Bunny" Garnett and Wogan Philipps.

Ker-Seymer married twice. She first married Humphrey Joseph Robinson Pease in June 1941, of Yewden Manor, Henley-on-Thames, a researcher for Mass-Observation. They divorced a year later in 1942. In March 1945, she married John David Rhodes (d. 2007), with whom she had one son, Max Humphrey Lionel Ewart Rhodes (later Ker-Seymer), born in 1947. They separated in 1949 but did not divorce until 1955.

In 1953, Ker-Seymer met Barbara Roett an American who had moved to England with her mother, Gwen Roett. Roett enrolled at the Slade School of Fine Art, where she studied sculpture. The two women would later be immortalised in the paintings Bar & Barbara by Beryl Cook.

She died on 25 May 1993.

== Legacy ==
Interest in Ker-Seymer's photographic career increased during the late 1970s and 1980s, when she was cited in several important publications on the history of modern British photography. The first was David Mellor's Germany: The New Photography 1927–33 (1978), which gathered original essays and papers by German photographers and writers from the 1930s, together with contemporary essays discussing the influence of Weimar photography on Britain. Mellor discusses Ker-Seymer's homage to Helmar Lerski in her and John Banting's use of egg white on sitters' faces, and the introduction to Britain of negative portraits such as her portrait of Nancy Cunard.

The second was Val Williams' The Other Observers: Women Photographers 1900 to the Present (1980), which charted the development of numerous female photographers from the turn of the twentieth century to the 1980s. In Ker-Seymer's case, Williams discusses how her work represented a visual departure from the high bohemianism of the Bloomsbury Group towards lightness, frivolity, and high society. Williams concluded that Ker-Seymer's portraits possess a "wit and style difficult to find in such concentrated form elsewhere".

In 1986, Ker-Seymer's work featured in a number of exhibitions and television programmes examining the history of women photographers. She was one of five photographers to be the subject of a dedicated Channel 4 television programme as part of the Five Women Photographers series. The other programmes focused on Grace Robertson, Margaret Monk, Ursula Powys-Lybbe and Helen Muspratt. The series was accompanied by the exhibition Women Photographers in Great Britain 1900–1950 at The Photographers' Gallery, London, and by Val Williams' publication The Other Observers.

Ker-Seymer's work has subsequently appeared in a number of exhibitions and displays examining interwar British photography, modernism, and British social history, including Modern British Photography 1919–39 (1980–81), Dance to the Music of Time: The Life and Works of Anthony Powell (Wallace Collection, 2005), One Hundred Years Ago (National Portrait Gallery, 2005), How We Are: Photographing Britain from the 1840s to the Present (Tate Britain, 2007), Spaces of Black Modernism (Tate Britain, 2015), Queer British Art 1861–1967 (Tate Britain, 2017), and The Enigma of the Hour: 100 Years of Psychoanalytic Thought (Freud Museum, 2019).

After her death in 1993, Ker-Seymer's partner, Barbara Roett, donated several personal photograph albums covering the years 1931 to 1945, together with loose portrait prints, several hundred negatives, and personal papers, to the Tate Archive.

In 2023, Sarah Knights published the biography Thoroughly Modern: The Pioneering Life of Barbara Ker-Seymer, Photographer, and Her Brilliant Bohemian Friends, which examined Ker-Seymer's life, friendships, relationships and career.

In autumn 2026, the Barbara Ker-Seymer Project was launched to further understanding of Ker-Seymer's photographic work, creative development and professional relationships.
