= Elizabeth Plunket Greene =

English crime novelist

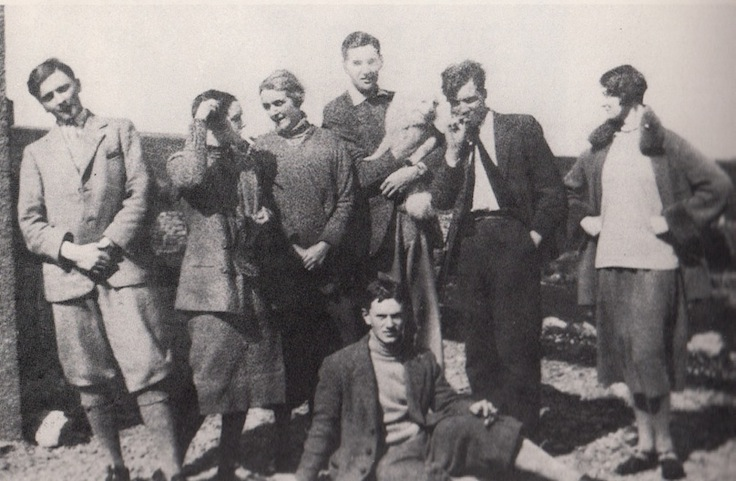
Richard Plunket Greene, first from the left; Olivia Plunket Greene, second from left; David Plunket Greene, holding the dog; Terence Lucy Greenidge, smoking, second from right; Elizabeth Frances Russell, first from the right; Evelyn Waugh, sitting down

Elizabeth Frances Plunket Greene (6 July 1899 – 18 December 1978) was an English crime novelist, writing in tandem with her husband, Richard Plunket Greene. She was part of the Bright Young Things immortalized by Evelyn Waugh in Vile Bodies (mostly inspired by the Plunket Greenes).

== Biography ==
Elizabeth Frances Russell was born on 6 July 1899, the daughter of Harold John Hastings Russell and Lady Victoria Alberta Leveson-Gower. She was a granddaughter of Lord Arthur Russell, and second cousin once removed of Bertrand Russell. Her aunts were Flora Russell and Diana Russell.

While her fiancé, Richard Plunket Greene, was a school teacher at Aston Clinton, Elizabeth Russell went to visit him and met Evelyn Waugh, with whom she formed a friendship. Sometime she drove Alastair Hugh Graham, who was Waugh's special friend of the time. It was the night of the party that Waugh and Olivia Plunket Greene, Richard's sister and Waugh's love interest, had organised to celebrate Richard and Elizabeth's engagement, that Waugh and Matthew Ponsonby, 2nd Baron Ponsonby of Shulbrede, Richard's cousin, were arrested while driving the wrong side in the Strand.

On 21 December 1926 Evelyn Waugh was a best man to the marriage of Elizabeth Frances Russell and Richard Plunket Greene. Patrick Balfour, 3rd Baron Kinross was a guest at the wedding. They had one son, Alexander Plunket Greene (1932–1990), who married fashion designer Mary Quant. Plunket Greene and Russell divorced in 1943.

Together with her husband, in 1932, she wrote Where Ignorance is Bliss, published with John Murray: "a murder story which is quite out of the beaten track." (Aberdeen Press). According to The Punch: "It is not easy to strike an original note, but the Plunket Greenes have overcome the difficulty so emphatically that they may almost be accused of thumping." In 1934 they wrote Eleven-Thirty Till Twelve, a detective novel set in London Society.

In the 1930s, Elizabeth Russell was a fan of motor racing and won a grand prix race in Belgium.

Elizabeth Plunket Greene died on 18 December 1978, aged 79.
