= Hurstbourne Priors =

Village and parish in Hampshire, England

Coordinates: 51°12′54″N 1°22′31″W

- Village and civil parish
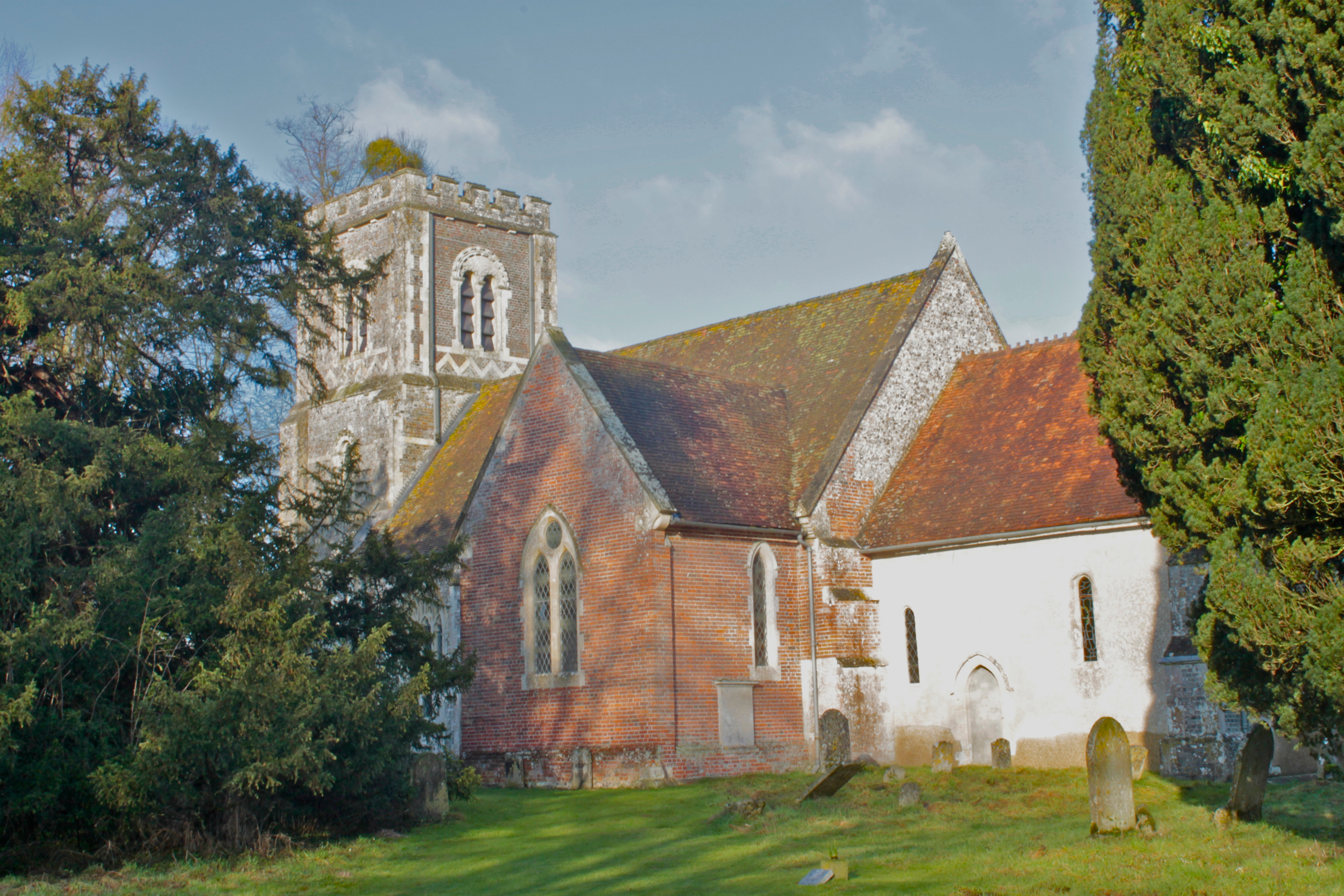
- St Andrew the Apostle

- Location within Hampshire
- OS grid reference: SU4373646383
- District: Basingstoke and Deane
- Shire county: Hampshire
- Region: South East
- Country: England
- Sovereign state: United Kingdom
- Post town: WHITCHURCH
- Postcode district: RG28
- Dialling code: 01256
- Police: Hampshire and Isle of Wight
- Fire: Hampshire and Isle of Wight
- Ambulance: South Central
- UK Parliament: Basingstoke

Hurstbourne Priors is a small village and civil parish in the Basingstoke and Deane district of Hampshire, England. Its nearest town is Whitchurch, which lies approximately 1.8 miles (3.1 km) north-east from the village.

== Geography ==
The parish sits astride the River Test, and a minor tributary, the Bourne Rivulet, runs north to south through the village, paralleling the B3048. The West of England line runs along the north of the parish, the nearest station is Whitchurch to the east or, slightly further, Andover to the west. The A34 runs through the south-east of the parish with a junction at Tufton.

== History ==
There is evidence of prehistoric Stone Age pit dwellings in the area.

Catherine Conduit, the great-niece of Isaac Newton married Lord Lymington and they lived in the former manor house at Hurstbourne Park, north-east of the village centre, which was described by Charles Kingsley as the "most beautiful park in the south of England". She brought with her a number of Newton's manuscripts and other relics. The house was destroyed by fire in the late 19th century but the collection was saved. The park itself is now Grade II listed on the National Register of Historic Parks and Gardens.

=== Church ===
The Grade II* listed church of St Andrew the Apostle dates back in parts to the 12th century and is probably the oldest existing church in the Diocese of Winchester. In the churchyard is the grave of noted Irish baritone Harry Plunket Greene (1865–1936), as well as those of his two sons, Richard (1901–1978) and David (1904–1941).
