= Gwendolen Plunket Greene =

English writer (1878-1959)

Gwendolen Maud Plunket Greene
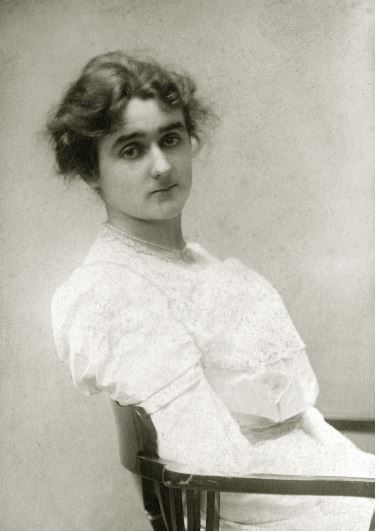
- Gwen Parry Greene in 1899
- Born: 6 February 1878; Kensington, London, England
- Died: 29 July 1959 (aged 81); Corston, Wiltshire, England
- Occupation: Writer
- Spouse: Harry Plunket Greene (m. 1899; died 1936)
- Children: 3
- Parents: Hubert Parry (father); Lady Elizabeth Maud Herbert (mother)
- Relatives: Richard Plunket Greene (son); David Plunket Greene (son); Olivia Plunket Greene (daughter); Sidney Herbert (maternal grandfather); Elizabeth à Court-Repington (maternal grandmother); Dorothea Parry (sister); Arthur Ponsonby (brother-in-law); Elizabeth Ponsonby (niece); Matthew Ponsonby (nephew)

Gwendolen Maud Plunket Greene (née Parry; 6 February 1878 – 29 July 1959) was an English writer on religion.

== Early life and family ==
Gwendolen Maud Parry was born on 6 February 1878 in Kensington, London, the daughter of Sir Charles Hubert Hastings Parry, 1st Baronet, a composer, teacher and historian of music, and Lady Elizabeth Maud Herbert, daughter of Sidney Herbert, 1st Baron Herbert of Lea and Elizabeth Herbert, Baroness Herbert of Lea. Her elder sister, Dorothea "Dolly" Parry (1876–1963), married the politician Arthur Ponsonby, 1st Baron Ponsonby of Shulbrede in 1898, and had a son and a daughter, the "Bright Young Things" Elizabeth Ponsonby and Matthew Ponsonby, 2nd Baron Ponsonby of Shulbrede.

The Parry sisters grew up amidst "the heart of late Victorian musical and artistic society", as Greene would later tell Evelyn Waugh, friend to her children. She mentioned dinner parties with Beatrix Potter and Oscar Wilde. As a child Gwen Greene was very attractive and she won a beauty show as a teenager. She was an accomplished violinist and performed at a concert in 1891.

== Marriage and later life ==
After the death of a previous fiancé, on 20 July 1899, she married Harry Plunket Greene. Their children were the Bright Young Things Richard George Hubert Plunket Greene, David Plunket Greene and Olivia Honor Mary Plunket Greene. They separated in 1919 and she decided to bring up her children alone. Evelyn Waugh was a frequent guest of the Plunket Greenes, he was in love with all the family. It has been said that Waugh's conversion to Catholicism was favored by Gwen Greene giving him von Hügel's letter and her book, Mount Zion.

In 1928 she edited Baron Friedrich von Hugel's Letters to a Niece, published with J. M. Dent & Son. Friedrich von Hügel was married to her aunt, Lady Mary Catherine Herbert (1849–1935). After the death of von Hügel, Greene's spiritual director was Father Bede Jarrett.

As Gwen Greene she published Two Witnesses (1930), Mount Zion (1931), and The Prophet Child (1935).

In 1936 Gwen Greene retired to Longleat Estate, Aucombe, with her daughter Olivia, who was battling alcoholism. In 1941 her son David committed suicide. In 1958 her daughter Olivia died from breast cancer and one month later Greene moved into St. Teresa's Private Hospital, Corston. She died on 29 July 1959. Her sister Dolly wrote: "She did not want to live... she died of a broken heart... the devotion to her children was remarkable".

Richard Plunket Greene died in 1978. When Harman Grisewood, who wanted to write a biography of Gwendolen Maud Plunket Greene, wrote to Alexander Plunket Greene, Richard's son, this latter told him that his father destroyed everything to do with the family, all correspondence included.
