= Olivia Plunket Greene =

British socialite (1907-1958)

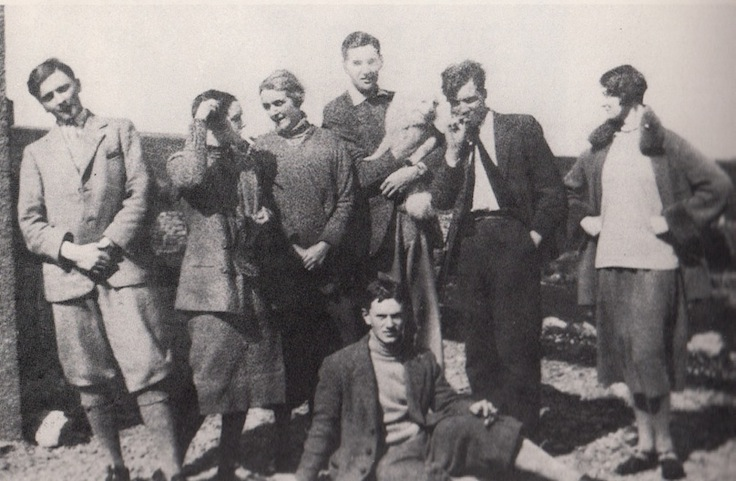
Richard Plunket Greene, first from the left; Olivia Plunket Greene, second from left; David Plunket Greene, holding the dog; Terence Lucy Greenidge, smoking, second from right; Elizabeth Frances Russell, first from the right; Evelyn Waugh, sitting down

Olivia Honor Mary Plunket Greene (7 March 1907 – 11 November 1958), together with her brothers Richard and David, was part of the Bright Young Things who inspired the novel Vile Bodies by Evelyn Waugh, who was Olivia's suitor.

== Biography ==
She was born on 7 March 1907, the daughter of Irish operatic baritone Harry Plunket Greene and his wife Gwendoline Maud Parry. James Knox described her older brothers, Richard and David, as a "wildly irresponsible pair who had never experienced any form of parental control".

Evelyn Waugh was at Oxford with David Plunket Greene and Richard Plunket Greene, fell in love with Olivia Greene and became a constant of the family. Waugh described the three siblings as being "tinged […] with melancholy". Waugh wrote about his attraction to Olivia in A Little Learning. According to Waugh, she was a tease who was available to everyone but him. It has been said that she is the model for the Honorable Agatha Runcible in Vile Bodies.

In 1936, Plunket Greene, an alcoholic, went into retirement at Longleat Estate, Aucombe, with her mother. In July 1958 she went to Bath for breast cancer treatment but died on 11 November 1958. The next day, her mother wrote to Waugh, and her letter is now in the British Library. She said she had saved all of Waugh’s letters to her. Her mother died eight months later, of a broken heart (her son David had committed suicide in 1941).

Harman Grisewood wanted to write a biography of Gwen Plunket Greene, and wrote to her grandson, Alexander Plunket Greene. According to him, Richard Plunket Greene destroyed everything to do with the family, including probably Waugh’s letters to Olivia. The Harman Grisewood Papers, including several letters by Olivia and Gwen, are at the Georgetown University Library’s Special Collections.
