= Babe Plunket Greene =

English socialite (1907-1987)

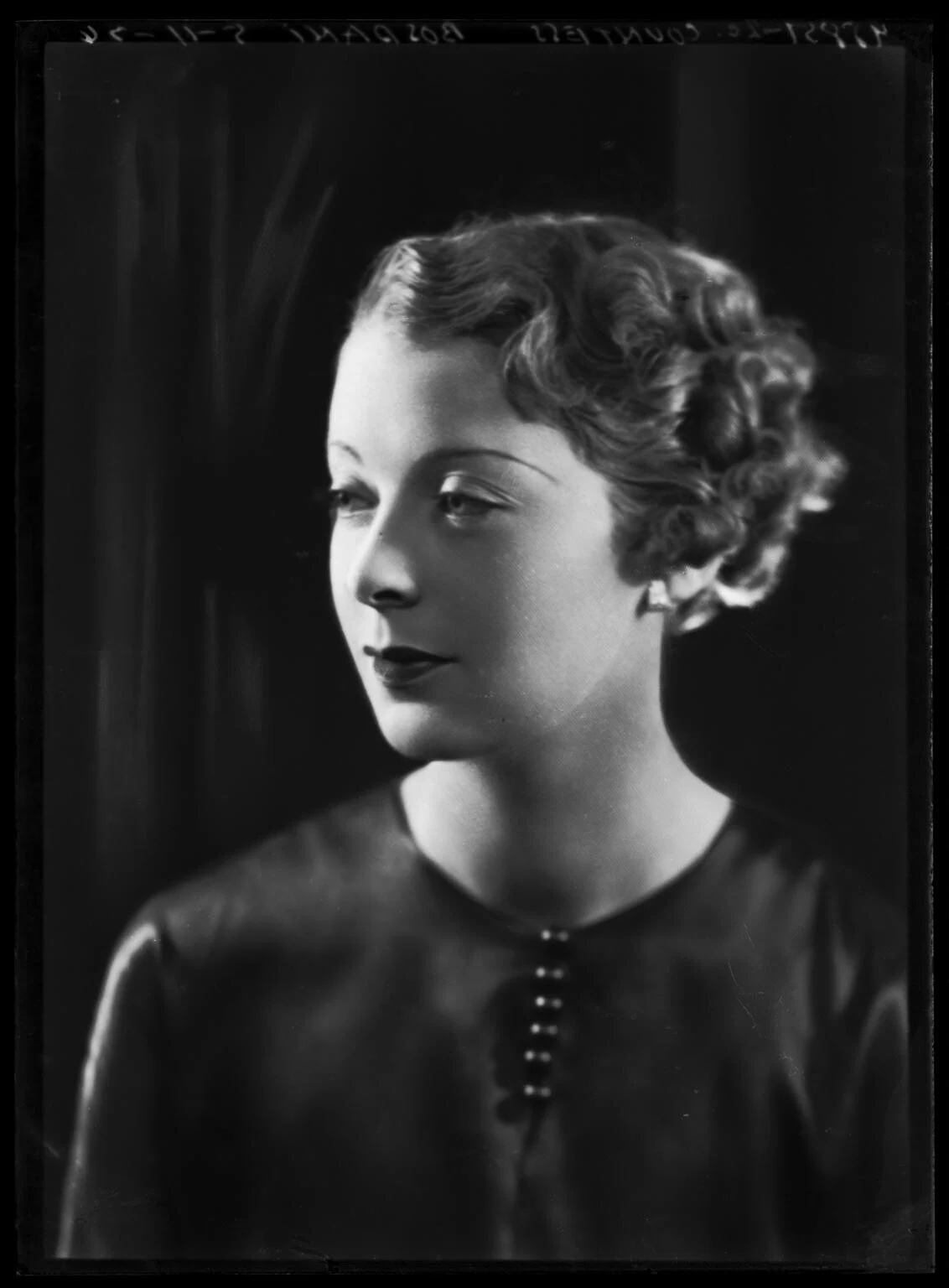
Bosdari in 1934

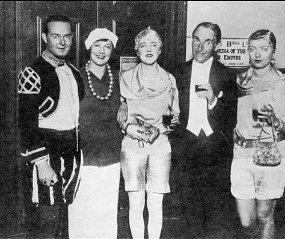
Greene (at the far right), at David Tennant's party in 1928, with William Acton, Margot Bendir (her mother), Elizabeth Ponsonby and Harry Melville

Babe Plunket Greene (27 October 1907 – 4 November 1987), birth registered as Enid Margot Bendir, was one of the 1920s English socialites known as the "Bright Young Things". She also used the surname of her mother's first husband, McGusty, and the first name "Marguerite".

== Early life ==
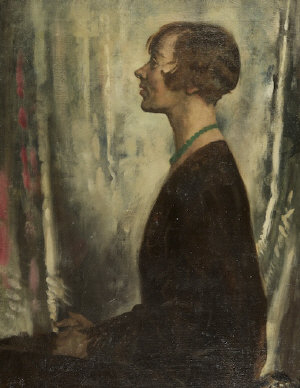
Portrait of Mrs Bendir (1926) by Sir William Orpen, a depiction of Babe's mother

Her mother, Ernestine Marguerite "Margot" Erskine, was a granddaughter of the Earl of Kellie. At the time of Babe's birth, her mother was married to Richard Murray McGusty, of a family of Dublin solicitors, who worked in Canada for the government. Babe's biological father was Arthur Bendir, with whom her mother had an affair starting in 1906, and eventually married in 1921, having divorced McGusty in 1908 following the child's birth. Arthur Bendir was the Chairman of Ladbrokes, which he founded in 1902, and immensely rich, although some, including Evelyn Waugh, made demeaning references to his "common" origins. Despite her name being recorded as "Bendir" at birth, Babe used the name "McGusty", presumably to obscure her illegitimate origins.

== Socialite and first marriage ==
She played a leading role in the hedonistic activities of the Bright Young Things, usually in the company of her friends Sylvia Ashley and Elizabeth Ponsonby (the latter also a cousin by marriage). In 1926 she married David Plunket Greene (19 November 1904 – 24 February 1941), the son of the singer Harry Plunket Greene. His mother, Gwendoline Maud, was the daughter of the composer Hubert Parry, with whom Harry Plunket Greene had collaborated. The marriage was short-lived, ending in divorce in 1928.

== Countess of Bosdari ==
She was also romantically involved with the Winchester-educated Anthony Herbert de Bosdari, son of the Italian banker Count Maurizio de Bosdari, allowing Anthony and his brothers to use the title of Count.

Bosdari and Babe, having married in October 1929, divorced in 1935, following several years of separation, and the unlawfulness of Bosdari's divorce from his first wife, Josephine Fish, came to light. Babe at this time was living in Upper Brook Street, Mayfair.

Anthony de Bosdari's romantic entanglements are somewhat unclear; he was engaged to the actress Enid Stamp Taylor in 1926; married, for a brief period in 1928 (from March 15 to October 31), to Josephine Fish, an American heiress; and was engaged to Tallulah Bankhead from the end of 1928 to May 1929. In 1931 he was engaged to marry the Duchess of Croÿ (born Helen Lewis, of American origin). According to the writer Alec Waugh, Bosdari was a friend in the 1920s who was interned by the Germans during the Second World War and is said to have lived in North Africa or South America later.

== Later life ==
In Brian Howard: Portrait of a Failure, Marie-Jaqueline Lancaster mentions a third marriage of Babe's, to "an American Hollywood magnate" (p. 160). This was the German-born screenwriter and director Lothar Mendes. Their marriage record in 1935 gives the bride's surname as "Greene or McGustry [sic] or Bendir".
