= Shulbrede Priory =

Priory in Linchmere, West Sussex, England

Coordinates: 51.061678°N 0.750938°W

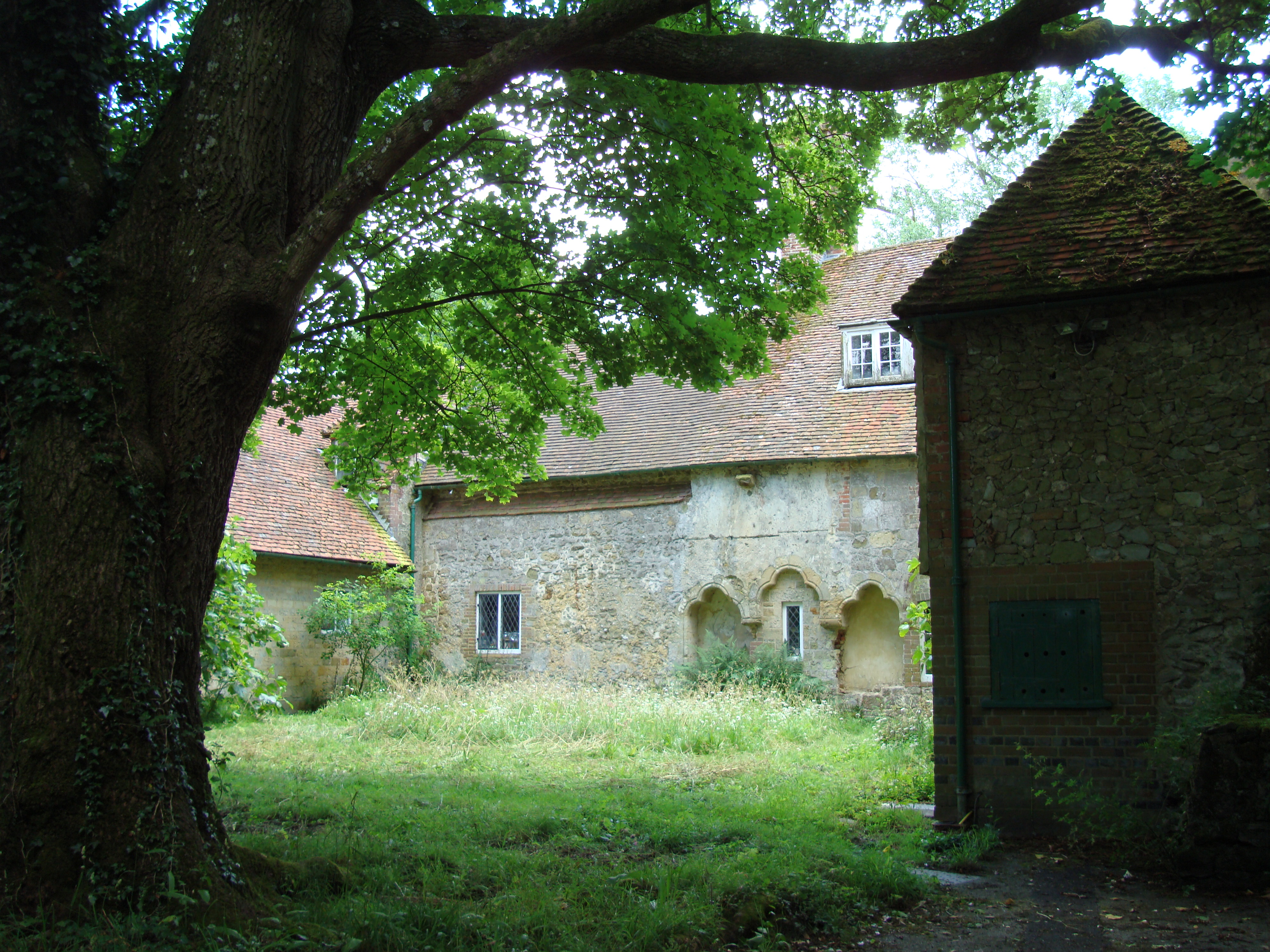
Shulbrede Priory

Shulbrede Priory is a former medieval monastic house in West Sussex, England; it became the home of the Ponsonby family, including the first Lord Ponsonby. It is a Grade I listed building.

== Early history ==
Shulbrede Priory was originally known as Woolynchmere Priory, being situate in the parish of Linchmere, which was at that time spelt Wlenchemere. It was founded as a house for canons of the Augustinian order, towards the end of the 12th century, by Sir Ralph de Arderne.

As built, it was very much larger than the portion now surviving. To the north was a cruciform church oriented towards an east facing altar, with north and south transepts dividing the nave from the chancel. The length of the church, from east to west, was about 140 ft (43 m) and, from the north to the south transepts, about 98 ft (30 m). To the south of the nave were cloisters, around which were grouped a Chapter House and Warming Room to the east, a refectory to the south, and a buttery, parlour and other buildings to the west.

In about 1234, Ralph Neville, Bishop of Chichester, agreed with the Abbot of Séez (Sées in Normandy, France) to appropriate the church at Shulbrede to the Priory, having previously been a "daughter" of the church at Cocking.

== Since the dissolution ==
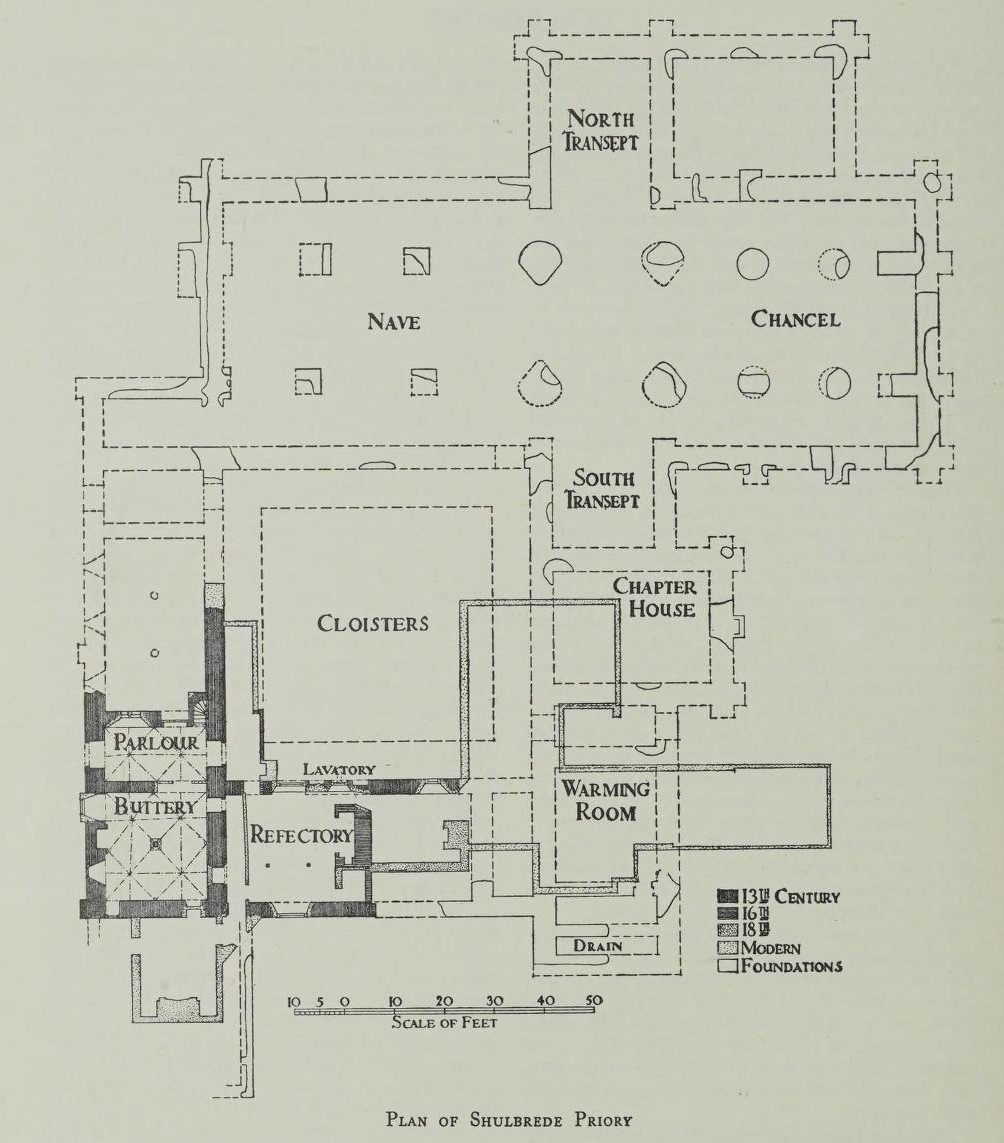
Taken from The Victoria history of the county of Sussex v. 4. The rape of Chichester

At the dissolution of the monasteries, the Priory became part of the Cowdray estate, which retained it until 1902.

The only portion of the Priory buildings which remained standing was the range of buildings to the south of the cloisters. This includes the parlour leading into the former cloisters, the buttery (an undercroft) and above it what was originally the prior's chamber or guests' hall. This was at some point divided into smaller rooms, and one of the partition walls was decorated with wall paintings, which can still be seen. The paintings are of birds, animals, women in Elizabethan dress, the Royal Arms of King James I, and animals with inscriptions in Latin referring to the birth of Christ.

== Ponsonby ownership ==
From 1902, Shulbrede Priory became the family home of Arthur Ponsonby, the son of Sir Henry Ponsonby, private secretary to Queen Victoria until 1895. In 1930 he was created Lord Ponsonby of Shulbrede.

His wife was Dorothea, the daughter of the composer Sir Hubert Parry.

Parry composed some piano pieces called Shulbrede Tunes, which were musical portraits of the members of the Ponsonby family.

Lord and Lady Ponsonby had a son, Matthew Ponsonby, later the 2nd Lord Ponsonby, and a daughter, the "Bright Young Thing" Elizabeth Ponsonby, whose family home this was.

Until 1925, when copyhold was abolished, the Court Baron of the Manor of Linchmere and Shulbrede was held in the priory.

When Lord Ponsonby died in 1946, his widow continued to live at Shulbrede Priory. It was the home of their granddaughters, Laura Ponsonby, who died in 2016, and Kate Russell, who still lives there with her husband.

== Listing ==
Shulbrede Priory became a Grade I listed building in 1959.
