= Decemviri stlitibus judicandis =

The decemviri stlitibus judicandis (Note: In later Latin, stlitibus would be spelled litibus. Classical Latin did not differentiate between 'i' and 'j'; although the modern orthography is judicandis, some sources use iudicandis.) was a civil court of ancient origin, traditionally attributed to Servius Tullius, which originally dealt with cases concerning whether an individual was free.

== History ==
Originally these decemvirs were a jury of ten men, serving under the presidency of a magistrate, but later this court became the magistratus minores, or lower judiciary of the Roman Republic, and was included among the vigintisexviri, or twenty-six magistrates elected by the comitia tributa. According to Suetonius and Cassius Dio, Augustus assigned the presidency of the court of the centumviri to the decemviri stlitibus judicandis. In imperial times, the decemvirs also had jurisdiction in capital crimes.

== Bibliography ==
- Gaius Suetonius Tranquillus, De Vita Caesarum (Lives of the Caesars, or The Twelve Caesars).
- Lucius Cassius Dio Cocceianus (Cassius Dio), Roman History.
- Clay, Agnes Muriel (1911). "Decemviri" . In Chisholm, Hugh (ed.). Encyclopædia Britannica. Vol. 7 (11th ed.). Cambridge University Press. p. 912.
- Luigi Colognesi, Law and Power in the Making of the Roman Commonwealth, Cambridge University Press (2014).
