= Richard Plunket Greene =

English racing motorist and author (1901–1978)

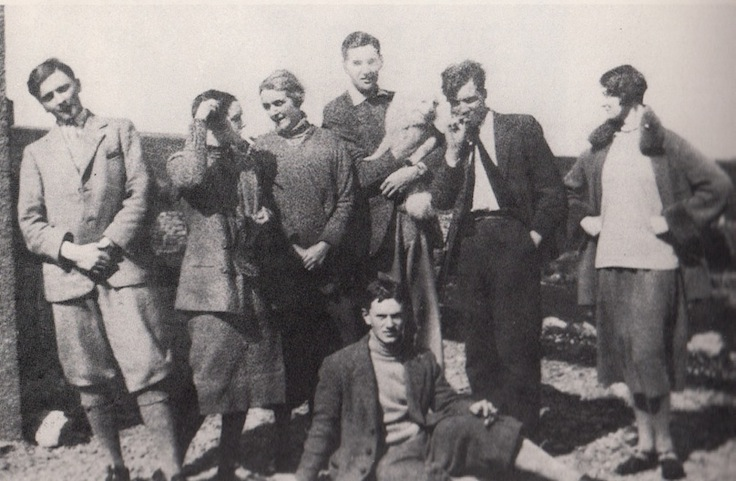
Richard Plunket Greene, first from the left, Olivia Plunket Greene, second from left, David Plunket Greene, holding the dog, Terence Lucy Greenidge, smoking, second from right, Elizabeth Frances Russell, first from the right, Evelyn Waugh, sitting down

Richard George Hubert Plunket Greene (1 July 1901 – 25 March 1978) was an English racing motorist, a jazz musician and author. He was also a member of the British socialite group known by the tabloid press of the 1920s as 'The Bright Young Things.'

== Biography ==
Richard George Hubert Plunket Greene was born on 1 July 1901, the son of Harry Plunket Greene, an Irish baritone who was most famous in the formal concert and oratorio repertoire, and Gwendolen Maud Parry, the daughter of Hubert Parry, English composer, teacher and historian of music. His grandmother, Louisa Lelias (Lilias) Plunket, was an author as well (Bound by a spell, or The Hunted Witch of the Forest, 1885).

He attended Oxford University where he formed a long-lasting friendship with Evelyn Waugh, who at one time, in the 1920s, was in love with Plunket Greene's sister, Olivia Plunket Greene. Waugh described him as "a piratical in appearance, sometimes wearing ear-rings, a good man in a boat, a heavy smoker of dark, strong tobacco, tinged, as were his siblings, with melancholy, but also infused with a succession of wild, obsessive enthusiasms. He brought to the purchase of a pipe or a necktie the concentration of a collector. During the next few years I saw him become a connoisseur of wine, a racing motorist, an exponent of the latest jazz, the author of a detective novel". The 1930 novel Vile Bodies, satirising the Bright Young Things, the decadent young London society between World War I and World War II, is partly inspired by the Plunket Greene family. Also at Oxford, Richard Plunket Greene made friends with Anthony Powell. He was also friend with Rosa Lewis.

In the 1920s, he was a school-master at Aston Clinton School. He introduced Waugh to the school’s headmaster, Albert Edward Bredan-Crawford.

The Plunket Greene's siblings, Richard, Olivia and David, went often to New York City, to have their trousers cut properly and to frequent the Harlem Renaissance clubs. Richard Plunket Green was a jazz musician and composer.

He was a racing sports car fan and competitor, on 8 August 1928, and on 17 August 1929 he took part at the Tourist Trophy with a Frazer Nash Boulogne. For a short period he was a business partner of sports-car designer Archibald Frazer-Nash.

On 21 December 1926, Evelyn Waugh was best man at Richard Plunket Greene's wedding to Elizabeth Frances Russell (1899-1979), first cousin once removed of Bertrand Russell. Her aunts were Flora Russell and Diana Russell and her great-grandmother was Diana Russell, Duchess of Bedford. Patrick Balfour, 3rd Baron Kinross was a guest at the wedding. They had one son Alexander Plunket Greene (1932-1990), who married fashion designer Mary Quant. Plunket Greene and Russell divorced in 1943.

In 1932, a story by Plunket Greene, A Gamble in Clocks, appeared in Life And Letters Vol. VIII No. 46 September, 1932, edited by Desmond MacCarthy. Together with his wife, in 1932 he wrote Where Ignorance is Bliss, and alone The Bandits, both published by John Murray. In 1934, they wrote Eleven-Thirty Till Twelve, a detective novel set in London Society.

Richard Plunket Greene died in 1978 in Falmer, England, and is buried at St Andrew Churchyard, Hurstbourne Priors, Hampshire, near his father and his brother David. When Harman Grisewood, who wanted to write a biography of Gwendolen Maud, Plunket Greene's mother, wrote to Alexander Plunket Greene, this latter told him that his father destroyed everything to do with the family, all correspondence included.
