= Baron Ponsonby =

Baron Ponsonby may refer to:

- Baron Ponsonby (of Imokilly), a hereditary title that was created in 1806 and became extinct in 1866
- Frederick Ponsonby, Baron Ponsonby of Roehampton (born 1958), Labour politician
- Baron Ponsonby of Shulbrede, a hereditary title created in 1930
- Baron Ponsonby of Sysonby, a hereditary title created in 1749 and held by the Earl of Bessborough
