= Lothar Mendes =

German film director and screenwriter

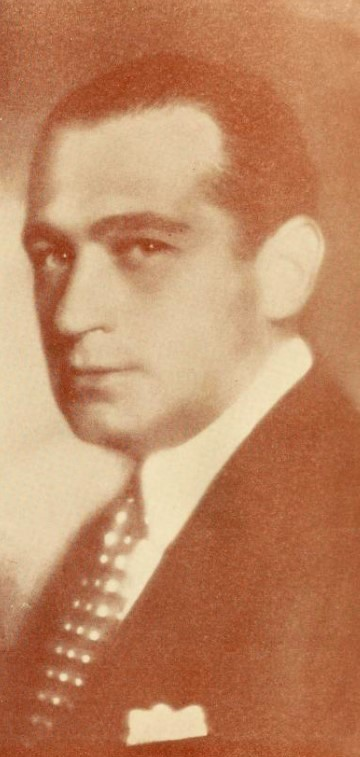
- From a 1926 magazine
- Born: 19 May 1894; Berlin, Prussia, German Empire
- Died: 25 February 1974 [Age 79 ] London, England, United Kingdom
- Occupations: Film director, Screenwriter
- Years active: 1918 – 1946
- Spouse(s): Eva May (divorced); Dorothy Mackaill (divorced); Babe Plunket Greene (divorced)

Lothar Mendes (19 May 1894 – 24 February 1974) was a German-born screenwriter and film director. His two best known films are Jew Süss (1934) and The Man Who Could Work Miracles (1936), both productions for British studios.

== Career ==
Born in Berlin, Mendes began his career as an actor in Berlin and in Vienna. After World War I he directed his first two films in Berlin with Michael Bohnen and became a well-known independent director. Called to Hollywood, he settled in the United States in 1926 and remained there until 1933, directing more than a dozen features, mostly frothy comedies, while under contract to Paramount. His films included the last silent film made in the USA, The Four Feathers (1929), and the murder mystery Payment Deferred (1933) starring British actor Charles Laughton.

After Adolf Hitler came to power, Mendes, who was Jewish, traveled to Britain to work at Gaumont-British Pictures, directing films with Michael Balcon producing. Under that banner, he directed Jew Süss (1934) starring Conrad Veidt, who had also emigrated from Germany. (Mendes' Jew Suss should not be confused with the later Nazi film of the same title released in 1940 which is a virulently antisemitic film.) Mendes' 1934 film version of Feuchtwanger's novel received strong notices at the time, and was considered an important and early film in exposing the origins of the antisemitism of the new Nazi government; in particular, it was praised by Albert Einstein and the Jewish American leader, Rabbi Stephen Wise, though the film itself did not attract an audience in Depression-era America.

Mendes best-known film, The Man Who Could Work Miracles (1936), is based on the H.G. Wells short story was made for Alexander Korda's London Films, for which Wells co-wrote the adaptation. It features Roland Young and Ralph Richardson. His last British film was Moonlight Sonata aka The Charmer and starred the piano legend Paderewski as himself; it contains rare performance footage of the legendary pianist.

After returning to Hollywood in the late 1930s, he directed five more studio films. Mendes co-directed the pro-British International Squadron (1941), starring Ronald Reagan; this was one of several films on the Eagle Squadron of American pilots who volunteered to fly in the Battle of Britain before the US entered the war. His last feature films were based on patriotic World War II themes with such stars as Rosalind Russell as a Navy reconnaissance pilot who must fly one more mission before getting married in Flight for Freedom (1943) and Edward G Robinson as a man who may or may not have married a spy in Tampico (1944).

"A competent, dependable director," commented film historian Larry Langman, "he never achieved the critical success in America that came to some of his compatriots."

== Personal life ==
Mendes' first wife was the actress Eva May, daughter of Mia May and Joe May. From 1926 to 1928, Mendes was married to the British-born silent film actress Dorothy Mackaill. The marriage ended in divorce. In 1935, he married Countess Marguerite de Bosdari (better known as Babe Plunket-Greene), former wife of Count Anthony de Bosdari and of David Plunket Greene.

Mendes retired from films in 1946 and returned to London, where he remained until his death on 24 February 1974 at age 79. He was then living at 54, Embassy House, West End Lane, London NW6.

== Partial filmography ==
- The Island of Tears (1923)
- Three Cuckoo Clocks (1926)
- Prince of Tempters (1926)
- Convoy (1927)
- A Night of Mystery (1928)
- The Street of Sin (1928)
- Interference (1928)
- The Four Feathers (1929)
- Dangerous Curves (1929)
- The Marriage Playground (1929)
- Paramount on Parade (1930) co-director
- Ladies' Man (1931)
- Strangers in Love (1932)
- Payment Deferred (1932)
- If I Had a Million (1932)
- Luxury Liner (1933)
- Jew Süss (US title: Power)
- The Man Who Could Work Miracles (1936)
- Moonlight Sonata (1937)
- Flight for Freedom (1943)
- Tampico (1944)
- The Walls Came Tumbling Down (1946)
