= Matthew Ponsonby, 2nd Baron Ponsonby of Shulbrede =

British peer

The Right Honourable The Lord Ponsonby of Shulbrede JP
- Born: 26 July 1904
- Died: 29 April 1976 (aged 71)
- Education: Balliol College, Oxford
- Spouse: Elizabeth Bigham
- Children: 5, including Thomas
- Parents: Arthur Ponsonby (father); Dolly Parry (mother)
- Relatives: Elizabeth Ponsonby (sister); Henry Ponsonby (grandfather); Hubert Parry (grandfather); David Plunket Greene (cousin)

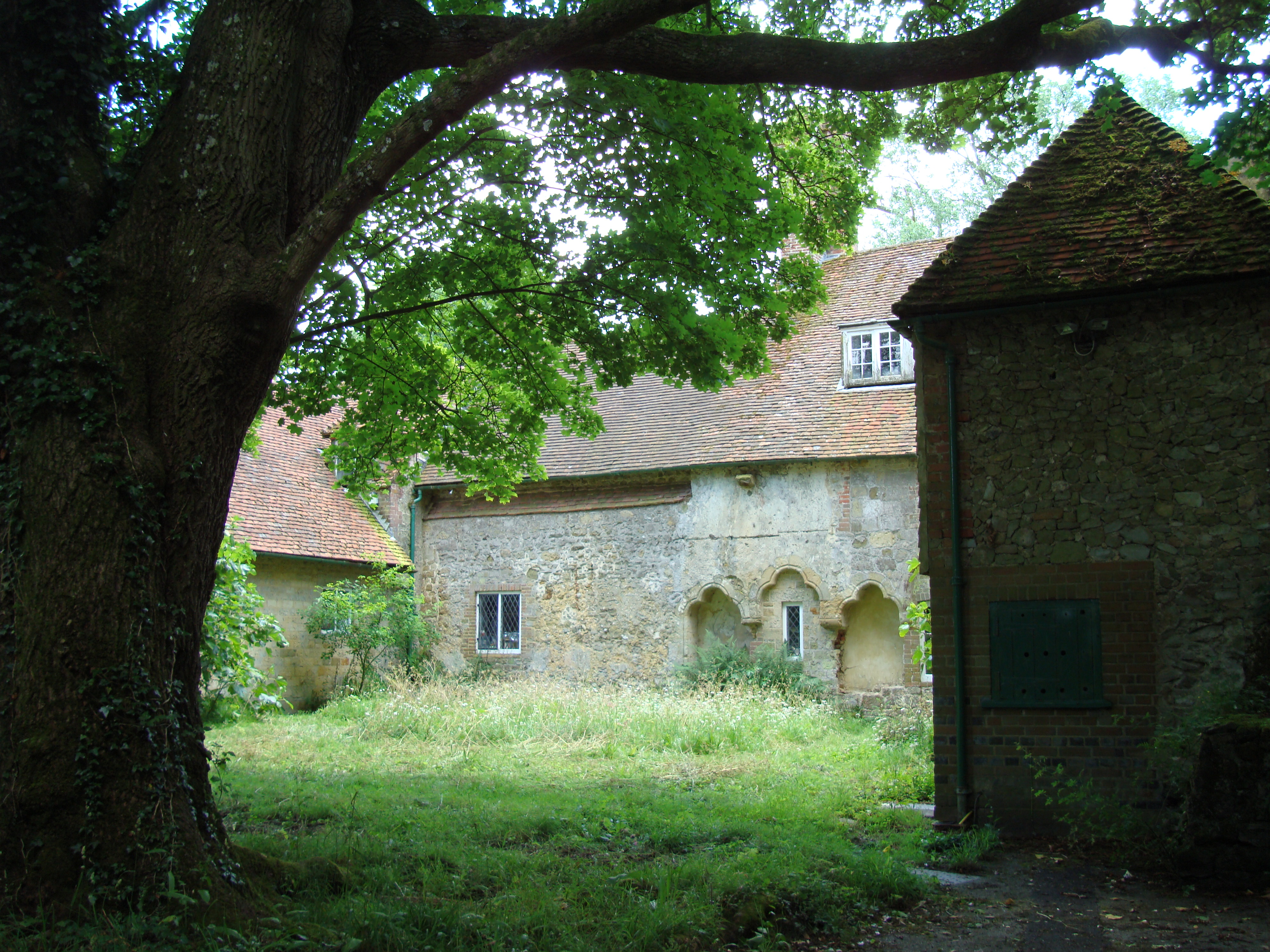
Shulbrede Priory, the Ponsonby country house

Matthew Henry Herbert Ponsonby, 2nd Baron Ponsonby of Shulbrede (26 July 1904 – 29 April 1976) was a British peer.

== Life ==
Ponsonby was the son of Arthur Ponsonby, by his marriage to Dorothea Parry. He was educated at Leighton Park School and Balliol College, Oxford.

Ponsonby had some difficulty with the Responsions to get into Oxford and had to be tutored for them, not arriving at Balliol until 1923, when he was nineteen. At the University, he became a friend of Evelyn Waugh, with whom in 1925 he was arrested by the police, while the two of them were on a pub crawl and Ponsonby was driving the wrong way along Oxford Street while drunk. Ponsonby later lost his driving licence and was fined £23 9s, then a large sum. Another university friend, Anthony Powell, recalled of Ponsonby's sister Elizabeth that she was "something of a gossip-column heroine of what came later to be looked on as the Vile Bodies world." Unlike his sister, he remained fond of their parents' country house, Shulbrede Priory, and enthusiastically took part in the archaeological digs there conducted by his father and Charles Strachey. At Oxford he was friend of Arden Hilliard, the son of the Bursar of Balliol College, Oxford.

Ponsonby married Elizabeth Mary Bigham (1905-1985), a daughter of Clive Bigham, 2nd Viscount Mersey, and they had five children: Thomas Arthur Ponsonby, later 3rd Baron (1930–1990); William Nicholas Ponsonby (1933–1942); Laura Mary Ponsonby (1935–2016); Rose Magdalen Ponsonby (born 1940) and Catherine Virginia Ponsonby (born 1944).

In 1930, Ponsonby’s father was created Baron Ponsonby of Shulbrede, a peerage to which he succeeded on the death of his father in March 1946, giving him a seat in the House of Lords. In 1955 he became a Justice of the Peace for West Sussex and he also became a member of the council of the Royal College of Music.

== Arms ==
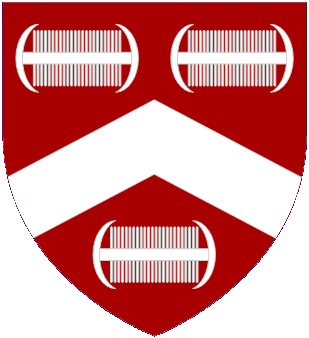
Arms of Ponsonby of Shulbrede

Ponsonby’s coat of arms is blazoned Gules a chevron between three combs argent. The crest, out of a ducal coronet, is azure three arrows, point downwards, one in pale and two in saltire, entwined at the intersection by a snake proper. The motto is “Pro Rege Lege Grege”, meaning For the King, the Law, and the People,

== See also ==
- Bright young things

Peerage of the United Kingdom
Preceded by Arthur Ponsonby	Baron Ponsonby of Shulbrede; 1946–1976	Succeeded by Thomas Ponsonby
