= Linchmere =

Village and parish in West Sussex, England

Coordinates: 51.07091°N 0.75999°W

- Location within West Sussex
- Area: 9.03 km^{2} (3.49 sq mi)
- Population: 2,392. 2011 Census
  - Density: 246/km^{2} (640/sq mi)
- OS grid reference: SU869308
  - London: 41 miles (66 km) NE
- Civil parish: Linchmere
- District: Chichester
- Shire county: West Sussex
- Region: South East
- Country: England
- Sovereign state: United Kingdom
- Post town: HASLEMERE
- Postcode district: GU27
- Dialling code: 01428
- Police: Sussex
- Fire: West Sussex
- Ambulance: South East Coast
- UK Parliament: Chichester

Linchmere, also spelled Lynchmere, is a village and a civil parish, the northernmost parish in the Chichester district of West Sussex, England. It is between Haslemere and Liphook, south of the B2131 road. As well as Linchmere village, the parish contains the settlements of Hammer and Camelsdale.

Linchmere parish is bordered to the north by Haslemere in Surrey with a tributary of the River Wey as boundary, to the east by Fernhurst parish, to the south by Linch civil parish with the Shulbrede stream as boundary, and to the west by the civil parish of Bramshott in Hampshire.

In the 2001 census there were 836 households in the civil parish, with a total population of 2,225. The population in the 2011 Census had increased to 2,392.

== Village Church ==
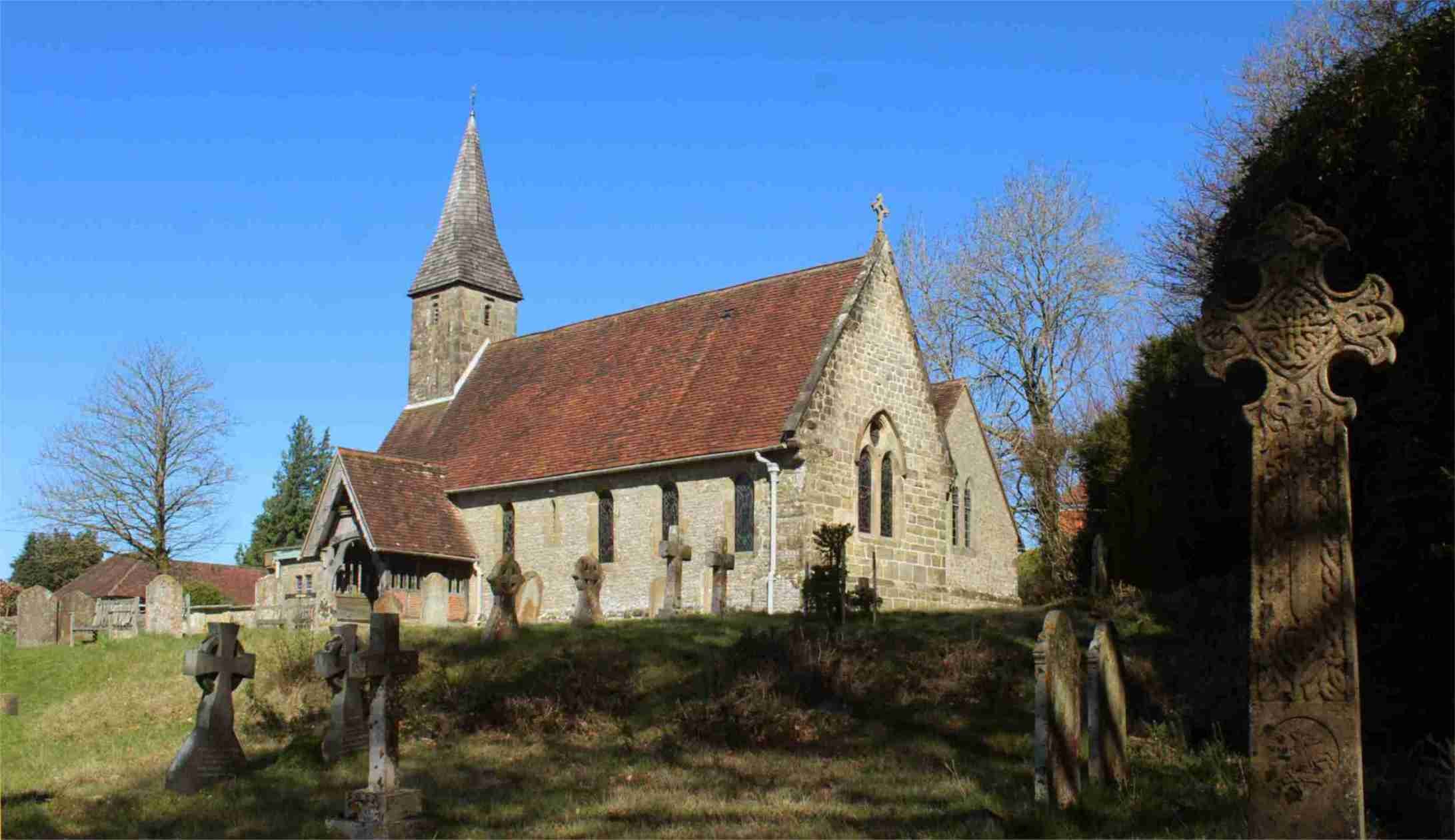
St Peter's church on south side of Linchmere village, UK

St Peter's church is on the south side of Linchmere village, on a high point overlooking valleys to the South and West.

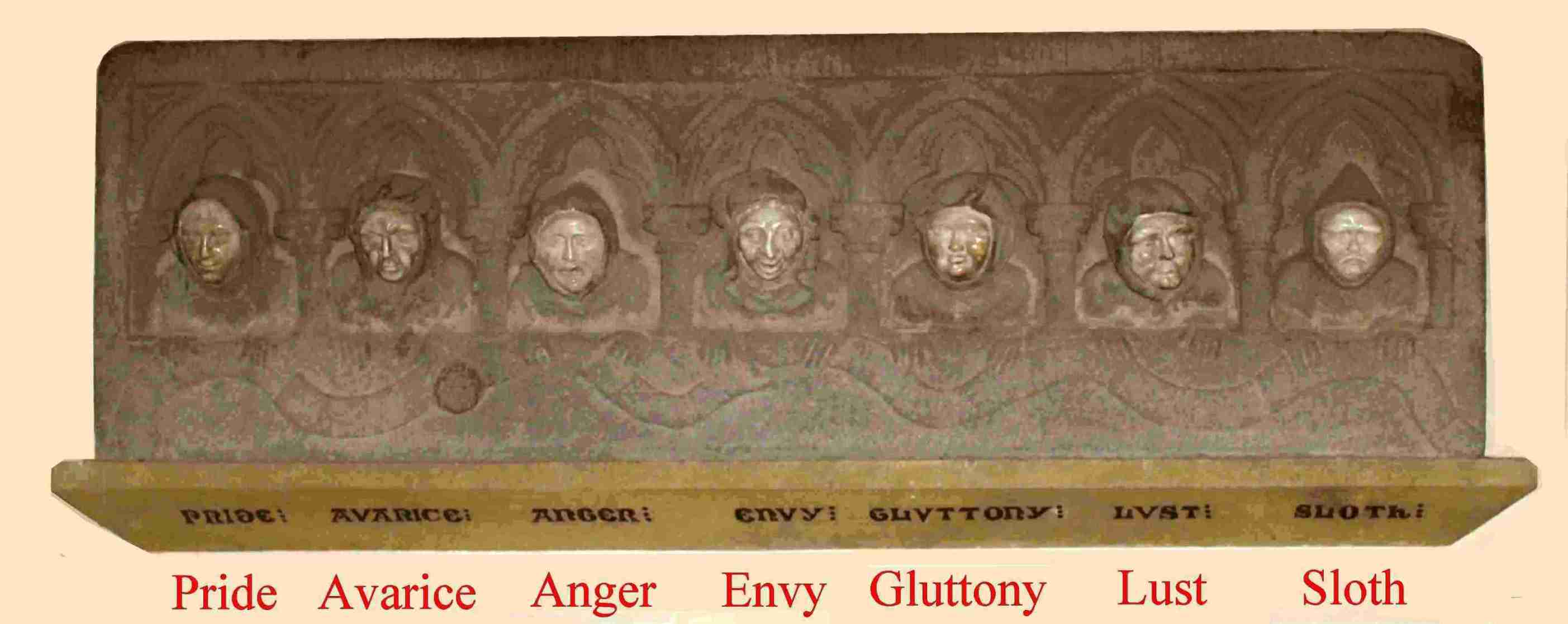
Linchmere church carving representing the 7 deadly sins

The BBC correspondent famous for his work in the 1939-45 war Richard Dimbleby is buried in St Peter's churchyard.

Inside the church on the North wall is an 8 ft long stone tablet with 7 human faces, representing the seven biblical Deadly Sins. A brass plaque says that it dates from about 1300AD and was originally in a church in the South of France, being presented to Lynchmere church in the year 1906.

== Village History ==
The name Linchmere was, in ancient times, spelled Wlenchemere.

South of the village is the remains of an Augustinian priory founded in 1200 was first known as Woolynchmere Priory and later as Shulbrede Priory. It is located 1.4 kilometres (0.87 mi) south of Linchmere village centre), and is associated with a nearly manor house and the peerage of Baron Ponsonby of Shulbrede.

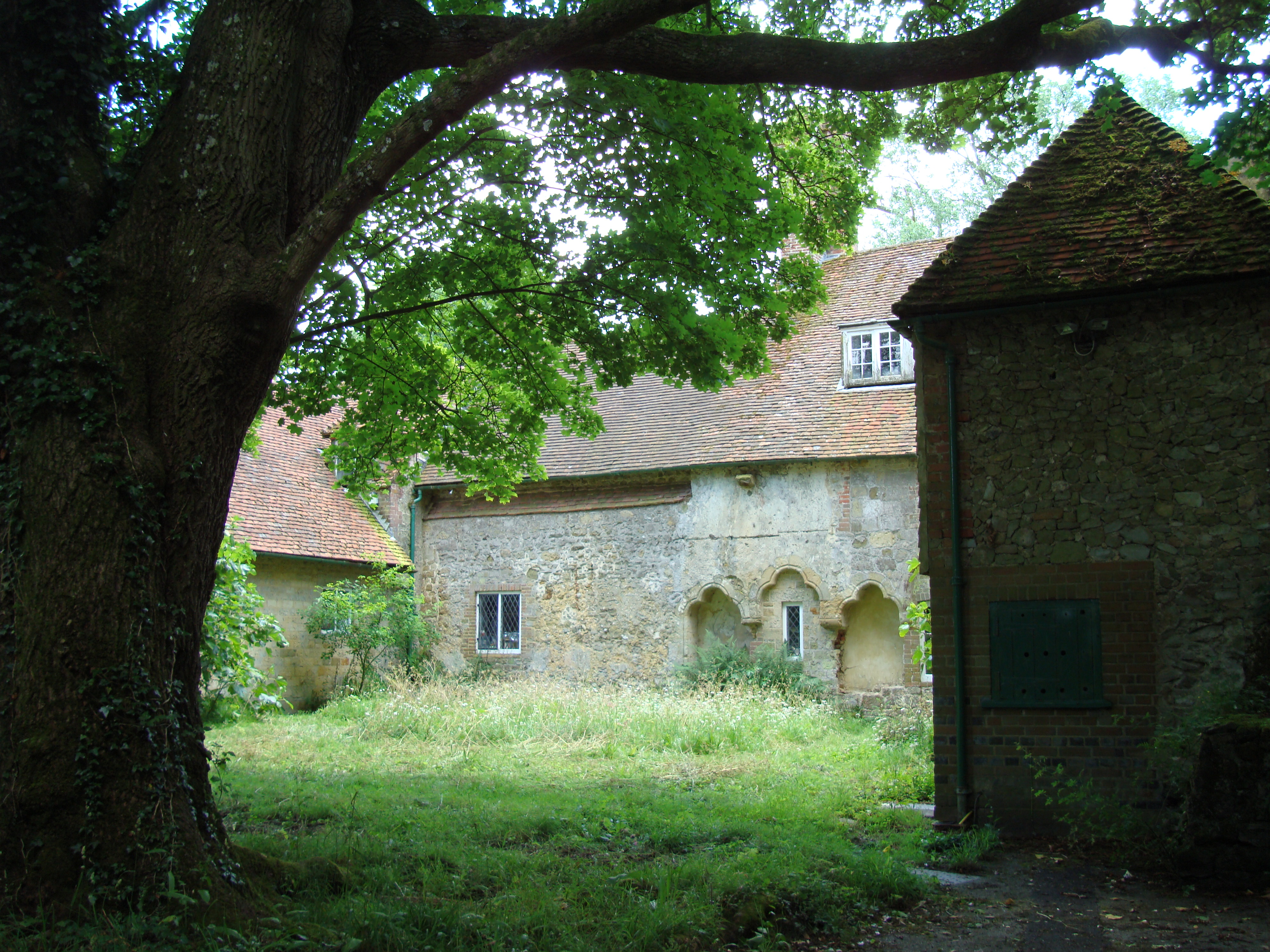
Shulbrede Priory

The settlement at Hammer took its name from an iron mill which was active there from before 1573 until at least 1730. There were also other iron works in the district including one partly in what is now Fernhurst parish, in Furnace Wood near Lower Lodge Farm, apparently started a little before 1620. The associated water supply is still named Furnace Pond and is just 2.8 kilometres (1.7 mi) south of Linchmere village centre.
