= Abel Greenidge =

Barbadian classical scholar and author (1865–1906)

Abel Hendy Jones Greenidge (22 December 1865 – 11 March 1906) was a writer on ancient history and law.

== Early life and education ==
Greenidge was born on 22 December 1865 at Belle Farm Estate, Barbados, the second son of the Rev. Nathaniel Heath Greenidge, vicar of Boscobel Parish, St Peter and his wife Elizabeth Cragg Kellman. His father- of a family resident on Barbados since 1635- was for many years a headmaster of various schools (Parry School, St Michael's Parochial School and Christ Church Foundation School). His brother, Samuel Wilberforce Greenidge, won a Barbados Scholarship in 1882 and went up to St John's College, Cambridge, was 25th wrangler in the Cambridge mathematical tripos of 1886, and the following year attained second-class honours in the Law Tripos. He was McMahon Law Student in 1888 and called to the Bar at Gray's Inn in 1889, but died in 1890.

== Life ==
Greenidge was educated at Harrison College, Barbados, winning in 1884 the Barbados Scholarship (first established when Abel and his brother Samuel were at school, providing £175 per annum for four consecutive years) and in the same year (15 October) matriculating at Balliol College, Oxford. Elected to an exhibition the following year, he was placed in the first class, both in Classical Moderations in 1886 and in the final classical school in 1888. He graduated BA in the same year and proceeded MA in 1891 and D. Litt in 1904. On 5 December 1889 he was elected, after examination, fellow of Hertford College. There he became a lecturer in 1892 and tutor in 1902 and he retained these offices until his death in 1906. He was also lecturer in ancient history at Brasenose College from 1892 to 1905. He vacated his fellowship at Hertford on his marriage in 1895 and on 29 June 1905 was elected to an official fellowship at St John's College. He examined in the final classical school between 1895 and 1898.

On 29 June 1895, Greenidge married Edith Elizabeth, youngest daughter of William Lucy of Headington, Oxford, who owned the Lucy Ironworks, previously known as the Eagle Ironworks, in that town. They had two sons, John Waterman and Terence Lucy. It was Terence who introduced Evelyn Waugh to the Hypocrites Club while they were at the University of Oxford together and between John, Terence and Waugh, they staged the Scarlet Woman, An Ecclesiastical Melodrama, which was an early cinematic production.

Greenidge died suddenly at his residence in Oxford of an affection of the heart on 11 March 1906 and was buried in Holywell Cemetery, Oxford. On 29 March 1907 a civil pension of £75 was granted to his widow "in consideration of his services to the study of Roman Law and History"; she died on 9 July 1907.

== Contributions to scholarship ==
Greenidge taught throughout his writing career. Two years after coming down from Oxford, he contributed many articles to a new edition of Smith's Dictionary of Antiquities (1890/91). His first book Infamia, its place in Roman Public and Private Law was published at Oxford in 1894. His next work was a Handbook of Greek Constitutional History (1896), in which he gave a narrative of the main lines of development of Greek Public Law, Roman Public Life (1901) in which he traced the growth of the Roman constitution and showed the political genius of Romans in dealing with all the problems of administration they had to face. This was followed by The Legal Procedure in Cicero's Time, Oxford (1901), a systematic and historical treatment of civil and criminal procedure. He also revised Sir William Smith's History of Rome (1897), (down to the death of Justinian) of the Student's Gibbon (1899). In 1903, in cooperation with Agnes Muriel Clay, he produced Sources of Roman History BC 133-70 (Oxford), designed to prepare the way for a new History of Rome. In 1904, he contributed an historical introduction to the 4th edition of Poste's Institutes of Gaius.

In the same year, appeared the first volume of A History of Rome during the Later Republic and Early Principate covering the years 133 to 104 B.C. This work was designed to extend to the accession of Vespasian and to fill six volumes, indeed a magnum opus, but no second volume (which was to end with the first consulship of Pompey and Crassus) was issued. The third volume was intended to be up to the death of Caesar, the fourth was to cover the Civil War and the rule of Augustus, while the fifth and sixth were to deal with the Emperors up to Vespasian. Much of Abel Hendy Jones' most interesting work is to be found in scattered articles, more particularly in the Classical Review. His merit as an historian lies in his "accurate accumulation of detail, combined with critical insight and power of exposition which was not unmixed with occasional paradox".

On his death, The Times recorded that "His death will be regarded as a great loss to classical scholarship; in his own department of ancient history he was an acknowledged authority, and what he had already given to the world gave further promise of the future." The Daily Telegraph declared that "Abel Greenidge had tapped sources of Roman Law that English scholars did not even know about".
