= 1908 Stirling Burghs by-election =

UK parliamentary by-election

The 1908 Stirling Burghs by-election was a Parliamentary by-election held on 22 May 1908. The constituency returned one Member of Parliament (MP) to the House of Commons of the United Kingdom, elected by the first past the post voting system. The by-election was caused by the death of the former Liberal Prime Minister, Sir Henry Campbell-Bannerman.

== Vacancy ==
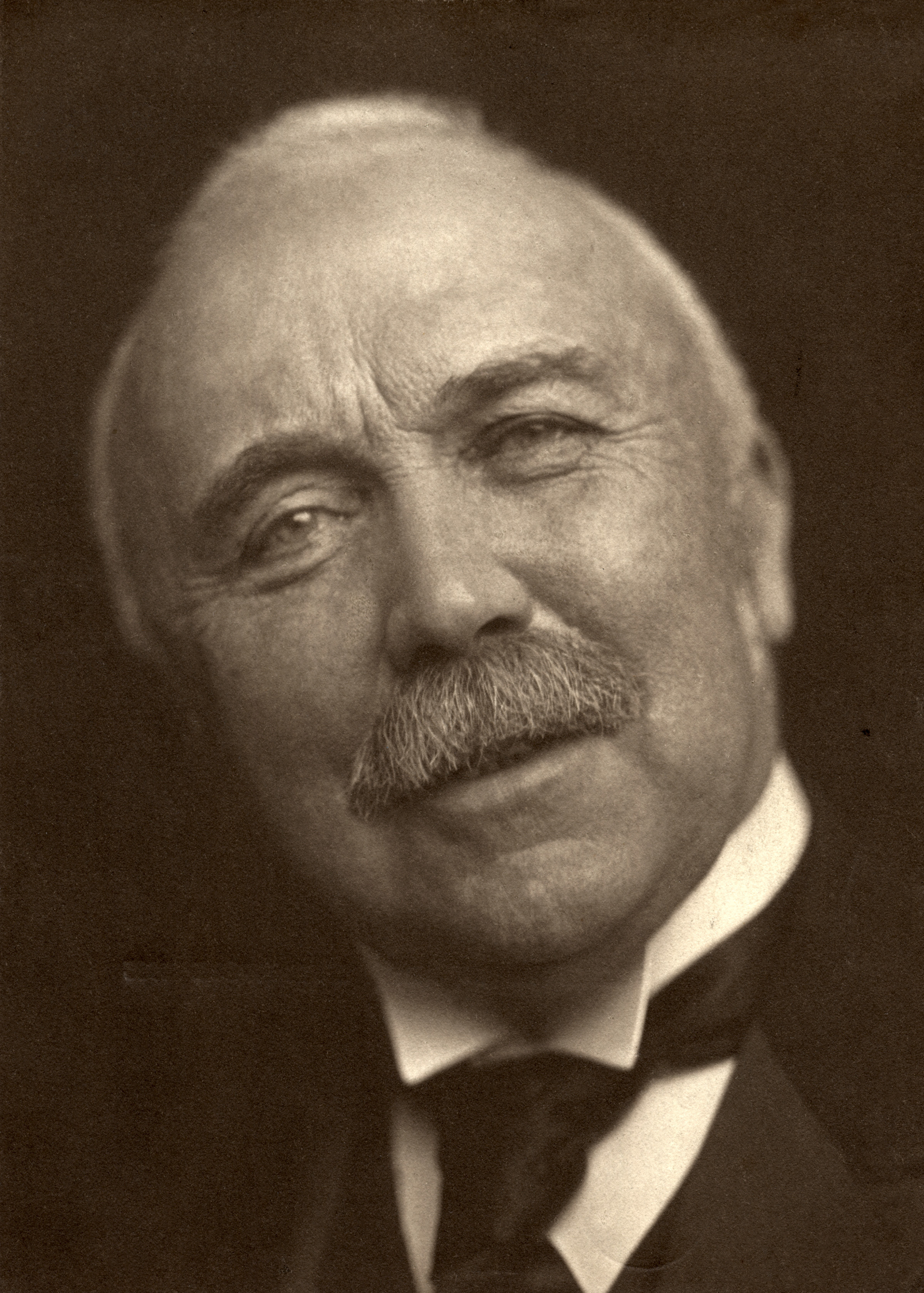
Sir Henry Campbell-Bannerman

Sir Henry had been a Liberal MP for the seat of Stirling Burghs since the 1868 general election. Following a series of heart attacks, he resigned as Prime Minister on 3 April 1908. He died on 22 April 1908 at the age of 72.

== Electoral history ==
The seat was safe for the Liberals. Sir Henry had not been opposed at the last election. The last contested election was the election before when his majority had been halved;

General election January 1900 Electorate
Party	Candidate	Votes	%	±%
Liberal	Henry Campbell-Bannerman	2,715	56.6	−6.1
Liberal Unionist	Oliver Thomas Duke	2,085	43.4	+6.1
Majority		630	12.2	−12.2
Turnout		4,800	74.7	+0.8
Liberal hold		Swing	-6.1	

== Candidates ==
- The local Liberal Association selected 35-year-old Englishman Arthur Ponsonby to defend the seat. At the time he was Private Secretary to Sir Henry. At the 1906 general election he ran unsuccessfully as a Liberal candidate for Taunton. He was the third son of Sir Henry Ponsonby, Private Secretary to Queen Victoria, and the great-grandson of Frederick Ponsonby, 3rd Earl of Bessborough. He was educated at Eton and Balliol College, Oxford, and joined the Diplomatic Service, taking assignments in Constantinople and Copenhagen.
- The Conservatives chose 40-year-old William Whitelaw as their candidate. He was elected at the 1892 general election as the Member of Parliament (MP) for Perth, but lost his seat at the 1895 general election and was defeated when he stood again in 1900. Whitelaw was a director of the Highland Railway (HR) from 1898, and Chairman of the HR since 1902.

== Campaign ==
Polling Day was fixed for the 22 May 1908, one month after the death of Sir Henry.

All the newspapers dwelt on the court connections of Ponsonby's father and brother, and of his having been a page to Queen Victoria. The electors were fascinated by an advanced radical with such an impeccable upper class, not to say royal, background.

== Result ==
The Liberals held the seat and managed an increased majority;

1908 Stirling Burghs by-election Electorate 7,558
Party	Candidate	Votes	%	±%
Liberal	Arthur Ponsonby	3,873	60.7	+4.1
Unionist	William Whitelaw	2,512	39.3	−4.1
Majority		1,361	21.4	+9.2
Turnout		6,385	84.5	+9.8
Liberal hold		Swing		

Ponsonby derived some benefit from the general atmosphere of a miniature general election that surrounded the by-elections of Asquith's new ministers.

== Aftermath ==
General election January 1910 Electorate 8,147
Party	Candidate	Votes	%	±%
Liberal	Arthur Ponsonby	4,471	64.9	+4.2
Unionist	Neil Cochran-Patrick	2,419	35.1	−4.2
Majority		2,052	29.8	+8.4
Turnout		6,890	84.6	+0.1
Liberal hold		Swing	+4.2	
