= Thomas Ponsonby, 3rd Baron Ponsonby of Shulbrede =

British politician (1930–1990)

The Right Honourable The Lord Ponsonby of Shulbrede

Member of the House of Lords
- Lord Temporal
- In office 14 June 1976 – 13 June 1990
- Preceded by: The 2nd Baron Ponsonby of Shulbrede
- Succeeded by: The 4th Baron Ponsonby of Shulbrede

Personal details
- Born: Thomas Arthur Ponsonby; 23 October 1930
- Died: 13 June 1990 (aged 59)
- Party: Labour

Thomas Arthur "Tom" Ponsonby, 3rd Baron Ponsonby of Shulbrede (23 October 1930 – 13 June 1990), was a British hereditary peer and Labour Party politician.

The elder son of Matthew Ponsonby, 2nd Baron Ponsonby of Shulbrede, and his wife, the Hon. Elizabeth Mary Bigham, daughter of the 2nd Viscount Mersey, he was educated at Bryanston School and Hertford College, Oxford.

== Political career ==
Ponsonby served in London local government for 20 years, firstly as a Councillor of the Metropolitan Borough of Kensington from 1956 to 1965 and then as an Alderman of the newly created Kensington and Chelsea London Borough Council from 1964 to 1974. He was also an Alderman of the Greater London Council from 1970 to 1977 and served as the Chairman of the Council from 1976 to 1977.

Ponsonby succeeded to the peerage on the death of his father in 1976 and made his maiden speech in the House of Lords on the subject of local government devolution. Elected as Labour Chief Whip in the House of Lords in 1982, defeating Lord Strabolgi, he served as Opposition Chief Whip until his death in 1990.

An active member of the Fabian Society, serving as its General Secretary from 1964 to 1976, Lord Ponsonby also served as a Governor of the London School of Economics from 1970 to 1990.

== Marriage and family ==
Lord Ponsonby married twice:

- firstly 1956 (divorced 1973), Ursula Mary Fox-Pitt (married secondly 1975, John Ingham Brooke; died 1990), elder daughter of Cdr Thomas Stanley Lane Fox-Pitt, by whom he had a son and three daughters, and
- secondly 1974, Maureen Estelle née Windsor (died 2007), widow of Dr Paul Campbell-Tiech, of Geneva, Switzerland.

He was succeeded in the barony by his only son Frederick.

Coat of arms of Thomas Ponsonby, 3rd Baron Ponsonby of Shulbrede
Coronet That of a Baron Crest Out of a ducal coronet Azure three Arrows, point downwards, one in pale and two in saltire, entwined at the intersection by a Snake Proper Escutcheon Gules a Chevron between three Combs Argent Motto Pro Rege Lege Grege (For The King, The Law, And The People)

== See also ==
- Earl of Bessborough

Party political offices
Preceded by Shirley Williams	General Secretary of the Fabian Society; 1964–1976	Succeeded by Dianne Hayter
Peerage of the United Kingdom
Preceded by Matthew Ponsonby	Baron Ponsonby of Shulbrede; 1976–1990; Member of the House of Lords (1976–1990)	Succeeded by Frederick Ponsonby
Civic offices
Preceded by Evelyn Denington	Chairman of the Greater London Council; 1976–1977	Succeeded by Lawrence Bains
