= Ladies' Man (1931 film) =

1931 film

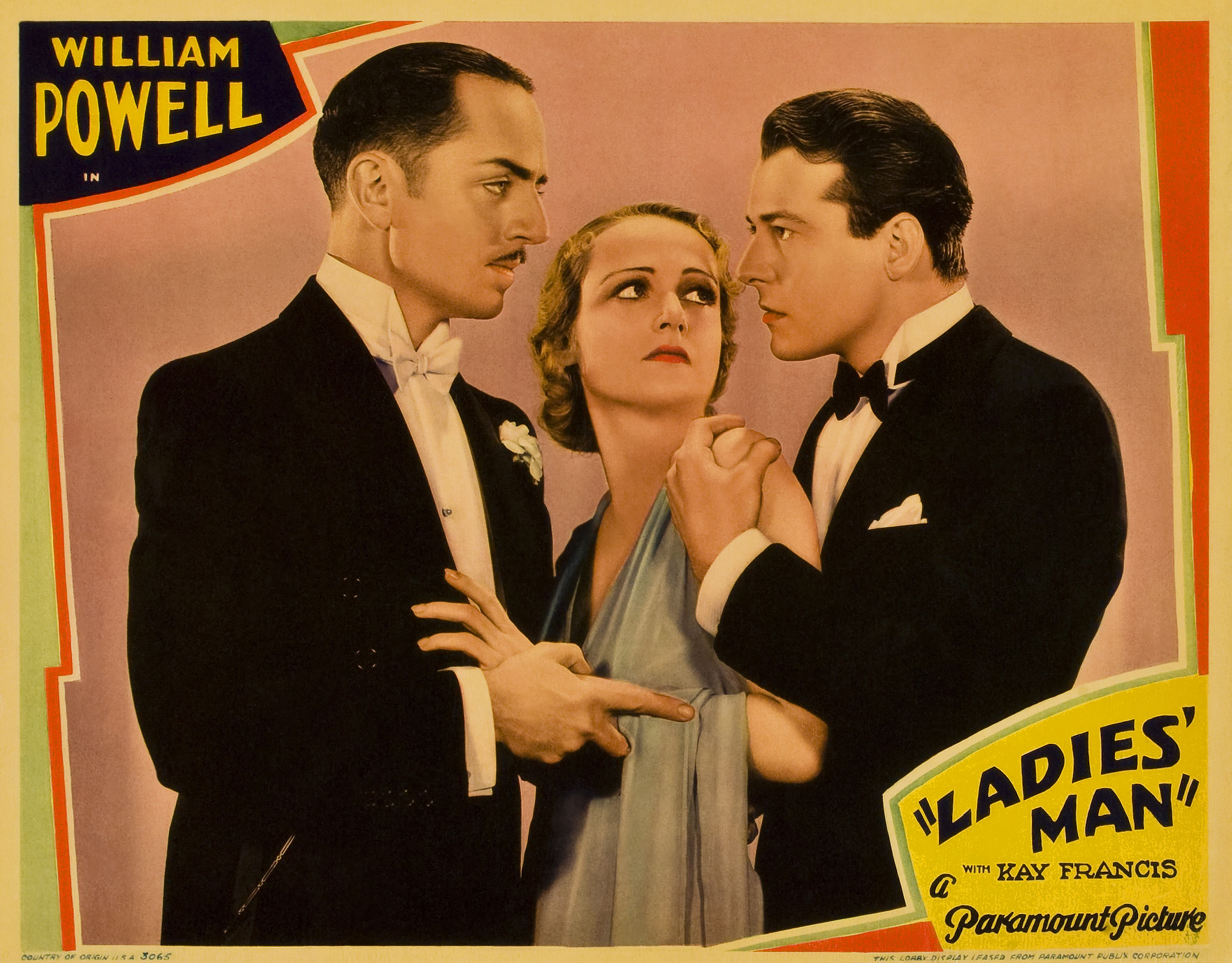
- Lobby card for film
- Directed by: Lothar Mendes
- Screenplay by: Herman Mankiewicz
- Based on: Ladies' Man; 1930 novel by Rupert Hughes
- Starring: William Powell; Kay Francis; Carole Lombard
- Cinematography: Victor Milner
- Music by: Karl Hajos; Herman Hand; John Leipold
- Distributed by: Paramount Pictures
- Release date: April 30, 1931
- Running time: 70 minutes
- Country: United States
- Language: English

Ladies' Man is a 1931 American pre-Code drama film directed by Lothar Mendes, starring William Powell, Kay Francis and Carole Lombard. It was released on May 9, 1931, by Paramount.

== Plot ==
A gigolo's career is threatened when the daughter of one of his clients becomes attracted to him.

== Cast ==
- William Powell as Jamie Darricott
- Kay Francis as Norma Page
- Carole Lombard as Rachel Fendley
- Gilbert Emery as Horace Fendley
- Olive Tell as Mrs. Fendley
