= Louisa Lilias Plunket Greene =

Irish author of children's stories (1833–1891)

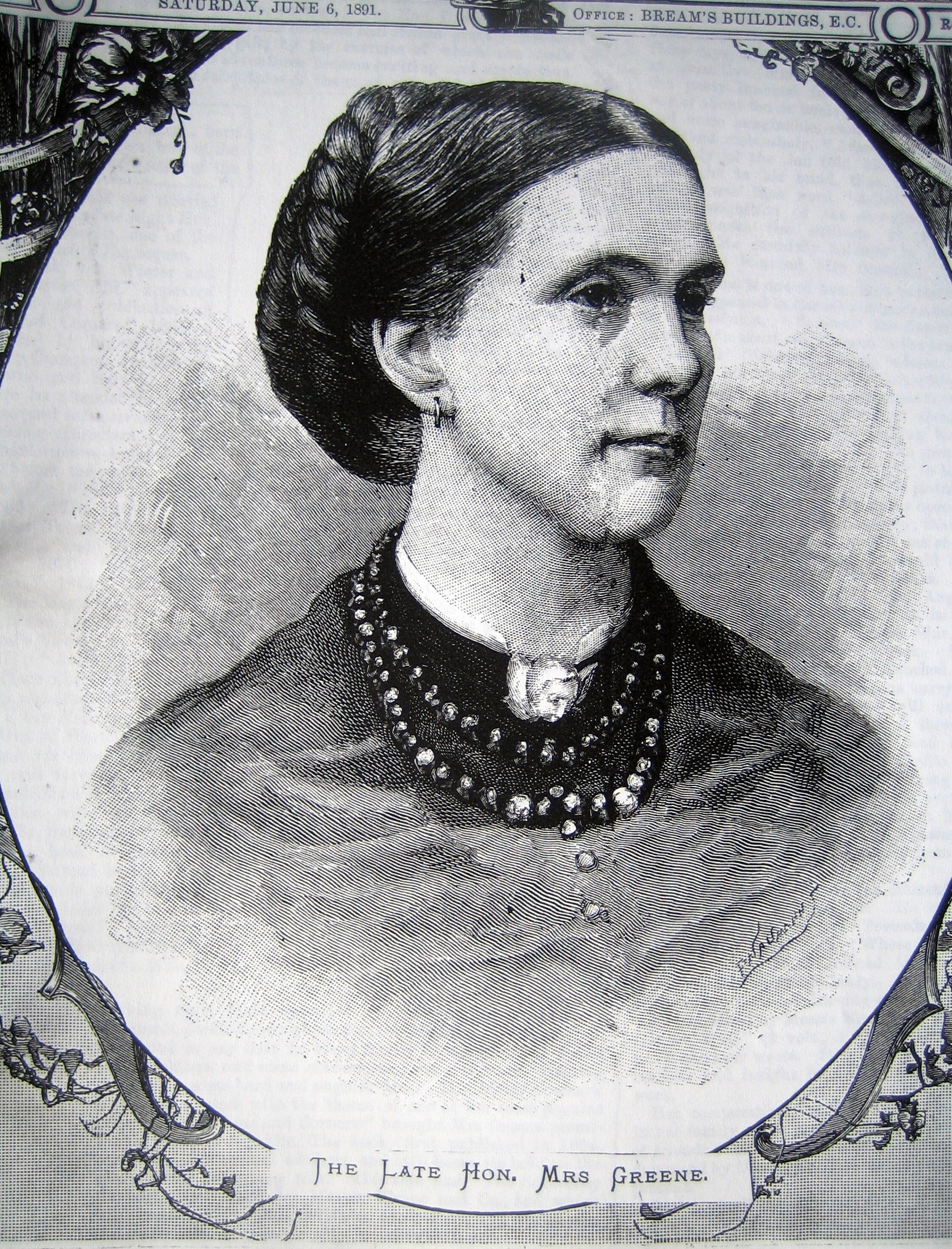
The Hon. Louisa Lelias Greene (Plunket)

Louisa Lilias (Lelias) Plunket Greene (7 November 1833 – 30 March 1891) was an Irish author of children's stories writing under the names: Louisa Lilias Greene, Louisa Lilias Plunket, Baroness Greene, R. J. Greene, Louisa Lelias Greene.

== Biography ==
The Hon. Louisa Lelias Plunket was born on 7 November 1833, the daughter of John Span Plunket, 3rd Baron Plunket of Newton (1793–1871) and Charlotte Bushe, daughter of the Right Hon. Charles Kendal Bushe, Lord Chief of the Court of King's Bench in Ireland. Her siblings were: William Conyngham Plunket, 4th Baron Plunket and Archbishop of Dublin; Charles Bushe Plunket (1830–1880); David Robert Plunket, 1st Baron Rathmore; Hon. Arthur Cecil Crampton Plunket (1845–1884); Patrick Henry Coghill Plunket (b. 1845); Anna Plunket (d. 1884); Katherine Frances Coghill (d. 1881); Hon. Charlotte Plunket (d. 1878); Emily Mary Plunket; Selina of Plunket; Josephine Alice Plunket; Isabella Katherine Plunket.

On 27 July 1852, she married Richard Jonas Greene, son of the Right Hon. Richard Wilson Greene, Baron of the Court of Exchequer (Ireland), and Elizabeth Wilson. Their children were:

1. Charlotte Selina Franks (1853–1883);
2. The Right Hon. Sir William Conyngham Greene (1854–1934);
3. Elizabeth Alice Greene;
4. Charles Kendal Greene;
5. Prof. Harry Plunket Greene (1865–1936); and
6. Geoffrey Philip Greene (1868–1930).

Louisa Lelias Plunket Greene died on 30 March 1891 in Dublin, Ireland.

== Works ==
- Across the Garden Wall
- Alda's Leap And Other Stories
- Bound by a spell, or the Hunted Witch of the Forest (1885)
- Little Castle Maiden (1870)
- The Broken Promise, And Other Tales (1870)
- The Brother and Sister, or What Can It Matter?
- Cushions and Corners, or Holidays At Old Orchard
- Filling Up The Chinks
- The Golden Wrens, A tale (1898)
- The grey house on the hill (1870)
- Harry Galbraith, or The Pierced Eggs (1887)
- The Lost Opal Ring (1905)
- The Lost Telegram (1908)
- Nettle Coats, or The Silent Princess
- On Angels' Wings, or the Story of a Little Violet of Edelsheim (1885)
- Prince Croesus in Search of a Wife
- The School-boy Baronet
- A Winter and Summer at Burton Hall, A Children's Tale (1861)
