= Dorothea Ponsonby =

English writer (1876–1963)

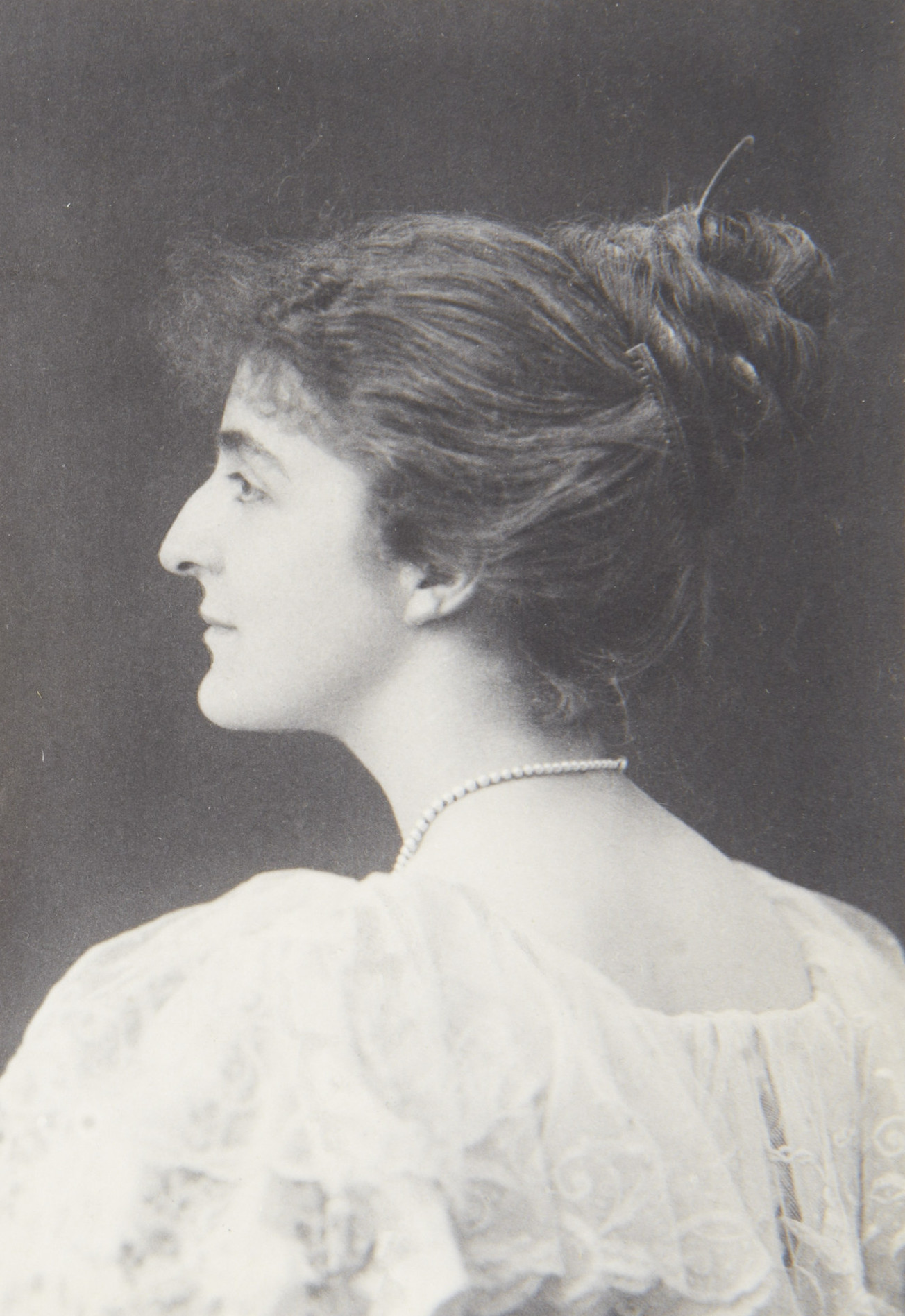
Dorothea Parry

Dorothea "Dolly" Ponsonby, Baroness Ponsonby of Shulbrede (née Parry; 13 January 1876 – 11 July 1963), was an English writer and close friends of the Llewelyn Davies and du Maurier families. She was the mother of Elizabeth Ponsonby of the Bright Young Things.

== Biography ==
Dorothea "Dolly" Parry was born in 1876, the daughter of Sir Charles Hubert Hastings Parry, 1st Baronet and Lady Elizabeth Maude Herbert (1851–1933). Her sister was Gwendoline Maud Parry.

On 12 April 1898 she married Arthur Ponsonby, 1st Baron Ponsonby of Shulbrede and had two children: Hon. Elizabeth Ponsonby (1900–1940, married John Denis Cavendish Pelly) and Matthew Ponsonby, 2nd Baron Ponsonby of Shulbrede (1904–1976).

In 1917, together with her husband, she wrote Rebels and Reformers.

She was a close friend of the Llewelyn Davies' family, a connection that started with her mother, Elizabeth Maude Herbert, who was friends (and admirer) of Margaret Llewelyn Davies, and Dolly became friends with Arthur Llewelyn Davies and in particular close friend with Sylvia du Maurier. She was also a close friend of J. M. Barrie.

== Death and legacy ==
Dorothea Ponsonby died on 11 July 1963, aged 87. She left a body of letters and her diaries which provide a useful insight into her life and the notable people that she socialised with.
