= David Plunket Greene =

Inspiration of the novel Vile Bodies

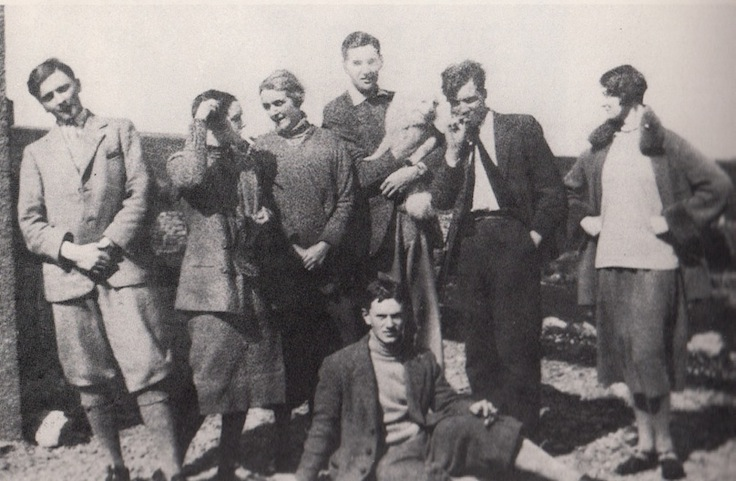
Richard Plunket Greene, first from the left, Olivia Plunket Greene, second from left, David Plunket Greene, holding the dog, Terence Lucy Greenidge, smoking, second from right, Elizabeth Frances Russell, first from the right, Evelyn Waugh, sitting down

David Plunket Greene (19 November 1904 – 24 February 1941), together with his brother Richard and sister Olivia, was part of the Bright Young Things who inspired the novel Vile Bodies to Evelyn Waugh, a family friend.

== Biography ==
David Plunket Greene was born on 19 November 1904, the son of Harry Plunket Greene and Gwendoline Maud Parry. James Knox described David and his elder brother Richard as a "wildly irresponsible pair who had never experienced any form of parental control".

He attended West Downs School, Harrow School, and then Oxford University where his brother Richard Plunket Greene was a very good friend of Evelyn Waugh. At Oxford Plunket Greene was part of the Railway Club and the Hypocrites' Club. When in May 1925 the authorities ordered the closure of the Hypocrites' Club, David Plunket Greene rented the former premises of the club. The 1930 novel Vile Bodies, satirising the Bright Young Things, the decadent young London society between World War I and World War II, is partly inspired by the Plunket Greene family.

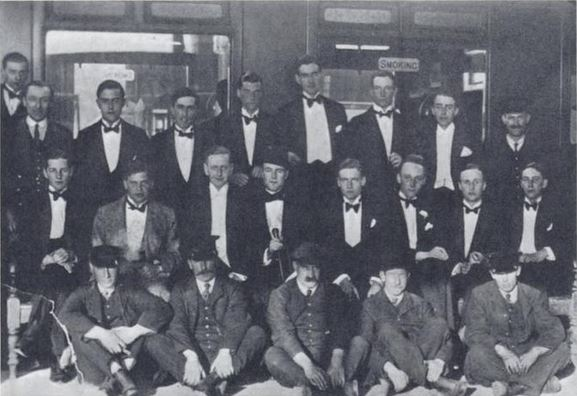
Railway Club at Oxford, conceived by John Sutro, dominated by Harold Acton. Left to right, back: Henry Yorke, Roy Harrod, Henry Weymouth, David Plunket Greene, Harry Stavordale, Brian Howard; middle row: Michael Rosse, John Sutro, Hugh Lygon, Harold Acton, Bryan Guinness, Patrick Balfour, Mark Ogilvie-Grant, Johnny Drury-Lowe; front: porters

David Plunket Greene was a "dandy devoted to all that was fashionable". His cousin was Hugh Lygon and therefore he was often a guest at Madresfield Court. Lygon and David attended West Downs together, and together decided to go to Oxford.

The Plunket Greene siblings, Richard, Olivia and David, went often to New York City, to have their trousers cut properly and to frequent the Harlem Renaissance clubs. David Plunket Green was also a jazz musician.

In 1926 he married Marguerite McGustie, nicknamed "Babe", daughter of W. McGustie. She played a leading role in the Bright Young Things, in the company of her friends Sylvia Ashley and Elizabeth Ponsonby, this latter David's cousin. The marriage was short lived, they divorced in October 1928, and already in May 1929 Babe Plunket Greene was announcing her engagement to Count Anthony de Bosdari, former fiancé of actress Tallulah Bankhead.

Blackbirds Party at David Plunket Greene's, Somewhere in Knightsbridge is a 1927 painting by Anthony Wysard currently at the National Portrait Gallery, London.

David Plunket Greene committed suicide on 24 February 1941. He is buried at St Andrew Churchyard, Hurstbourne Priors, Hampshire, near his father and his brother Richard.
