= Arthur Ponsonby, 1st Baron Ponsonby of Shulbrede =

British politician, writer, and social activist (1871–1946)

The Right Honourable The Lord Ponsonby of Shulbrede
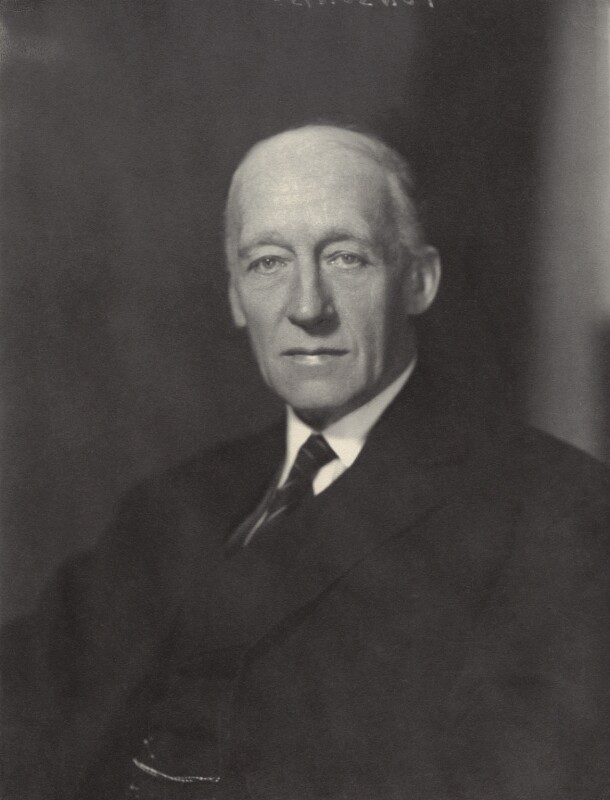
- Ponsonby in 1934

Chancellor of the Duchy of Lancaster
- In office 13 March – 25 August 1931
- Prime Minister: Ramsay MacDonald
- Preceded by: Clement Attlee
- Succeeded by: The Marquess of Lothian

Parliamentary Secretary to the Ministry of Transport
- In office 1929–1931
- Preceded by: The Earl Russell
- Succeeded by: John Allen Parkinson

Member of Parliament for Sheffield Brightside
- In office 15 November 1922 – 1930
- Preceded by: Tudor Walters
- Succeeded by: Fred Marshall

Member of Parliament for Stirling Burghs
- In office 1908 – 25 November 1918
- Preceded by: Henry Campbell-Bannerman
- Succeeded by: Constituency abolished

Personal details
- Born: 16 February 1871
- Died: 23 March 1946 (aged 75)
- Spouse: Dorothea Parry (m. 1898)
- Children: 2 (Elizabeth and Matthew)
- Parents: Henry Ponsonby (father); Mary Bulteel (mother)
- Education: Balliol College, Oxford

Arthur Augustus William Harry Ponsonby, 1st Baron Ponsonby of Shulbrede (16 February 1871 – 23 March 1946), was a British politician, writer, and social activist. He was the son of Sir Henry Ponsonby, Private Secretary to Queen Victoria, and Mary Elizabeth Bulteel, daughter of John Crocker Bulteel. He was also the great-grandson of The 3rd Earl of Bessborough, The 3rd Earl of Bathurst and The 2nd Earl Grey. The 1st Baron Sysonby was his elder brother.

Ponsonby is often quoted as the author of the dictum "When war is declared, truth is the first casualty", published in his book Falsehood in War-time, Containing an Assortment of Lies Circulated Throughout the Nations During the Great War (1928). However, he uses this phrase in quotation marks as an epigram at the start of the book and does not present it as his own words. Its likely origin is the almost identical line spoken in 1917 by the United States Senator Hiram Johnson: "The first casualty when war comes is truth".

== Education and early career ==
Ponsonby was a Page of Honour to Queen Victoria from 1882 to 1887. From an Anglo-Irish family, he was educated at Eton College. While at Eton, Ponsonby was whipped for organising a steeplechase in his dormitory.

Ponsonby studied at Balliol College, Oxford, before joining the Diplomatic Service and taking assignments in Constantinople and Copenhagen.

== Politics ==
At the 1906 general election, Ponsonby stood unsuccessfully as Liberal candidate for Taunton. He was elected as Member of Parliament for Stirling Burghs at a by-election of 1908, succeeding former Prime Minister Henry Campbell-Bannerman, who had died a few weeks earlier.

In Parliament, Ponsonby opposed the British involvement in the First World War and, with George Cadbury, Ramsay MacDonald, E. D. Morel, Arnold Rowntree, and Charles Trevelyan, he was a member of the Union of Democratic Control, which became a prominent antiwar organisation in Britain.

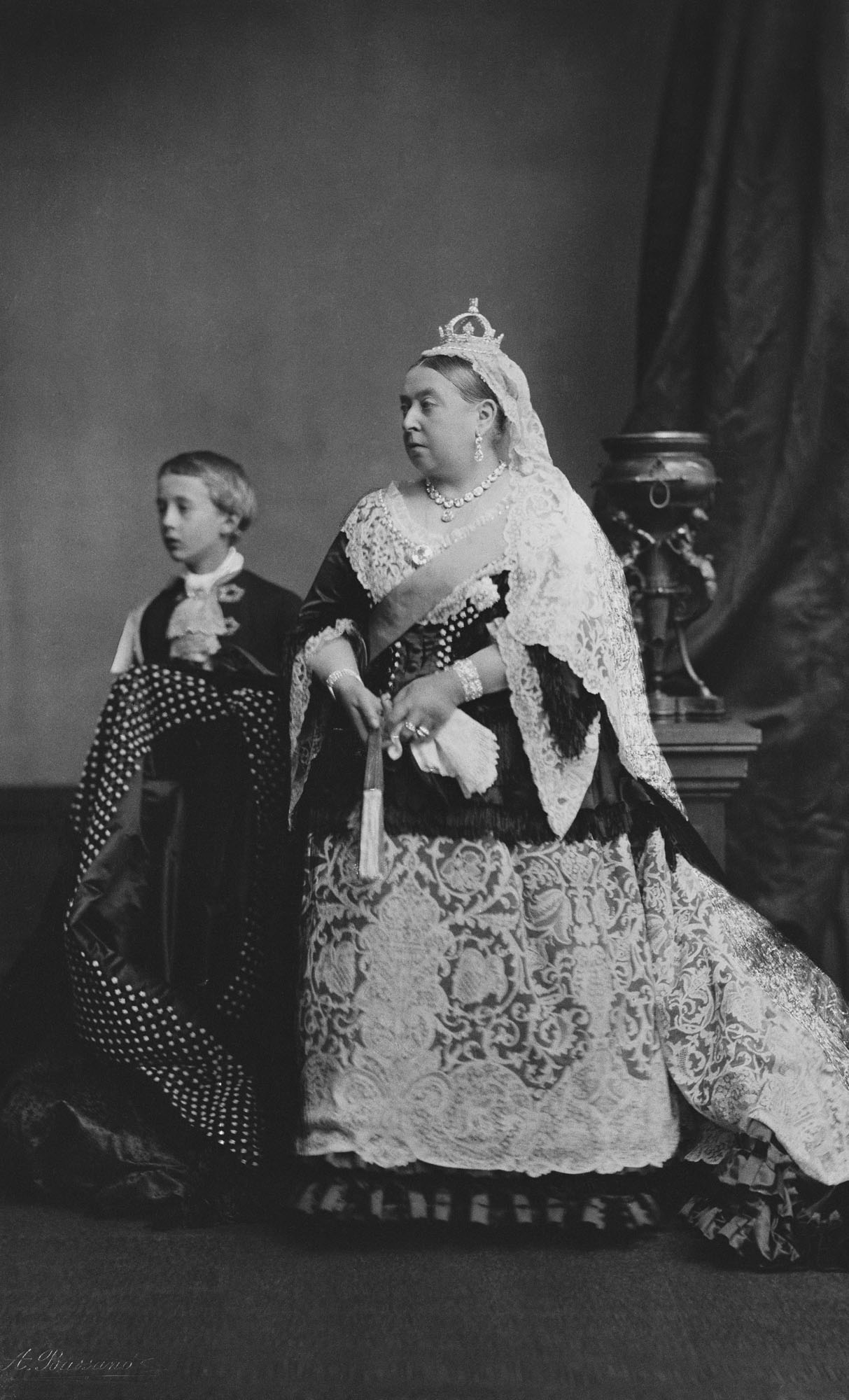
Queen Victoria and her page, Arthur Ponsonby

Ponsonby was defeated at the 1918 general election in which he stood as an "Independent Democrat" in the new Dunfermline Burghs constituency. He then joined the Labour Party and returned to the House of Commons at the 1922 general election as member for the Brightside division of Sheffield.

In 1924, Ramsay MacDonald appointed Ponsonby as Parliamentary Under-Secretary of State for Foreign Affairs, and he later served as Under-Secretary of State for Dominion Affairs and then as Parliamentary Secretary to the Ministry of Transport in 1929. Ponsonby was a leader in the antiwar wing of the Labour Party, a champion of "humanitarian pacifism" which held that the First World War was a sort of conspiracy against the ordinary people of the world by capitalist elites who sough to enrich themselves via war. In his 1925 pamphlet Now is the Time, he deplored "the millions who have fallen in the war" and denounced the "great conspiracy" by the governments of Europe to plunge the world into war. Ponsonby declared that the defining issue of the day was to establish "democratic" control over diplomacy to end the "great conspiracy" to promote "war mentality" as the prelude to another world war. Like many other British socialists, Ponsonby had a strong dislike of the Foreign Office, which was dominated by the scions of the British aristocracy, as a secretive and elitist group who he believed served only the interests of "the Establishment" instead of ordinary British people.

In 1928, he published the book Falsehood in Wartime, an elaboration of the thesis that he presented in Now is the Time that the First World War was far from being the crusade against evil that it was presented as in the United Kingdom at the time. Ponosonby argued that the war was instead merely a cynical exercise by the British government to lie to its own people to start and sustain a war intended only to enrich the arms industry. Ponsonby examined the causes of the war and the war aims of the belligerent powers, but his main focus was in rebutting allegations of German atrocities during the war to prove his thesis of the "great conspiracy". He was especially concerned to rebut the "rape of Belgium" story as he claimed that the reports in British newspapers during the war about widespread German atrocities during the invasion of Belgium in 1914 were all lies and the German Army had behaved in a honourable and noble fashion towards the Belgian people. His book had chapters dedicated to rebutting the stories about the "mutilated nurse", the "Belgian baby without hands", the story of the Canadian soldier crucified during the Second Battle of Ypres in April 1915, and the "corpse factory" story of 1917 that claimed the Germans were turning the bodies of slain Allied soldiers into soap. The book concluded that "the international war is a monster born of hypocrisy fed on falsehood, fattened by humbug, kept alive by superstition, directed to the death and torture of millions".

The Irish historians Alan Kramer and John Horne wrote that the specific examples that Ponsonby cited were true, but that his book ventured into historical negationism with its sweeping claims that all of the stories about German atrocities against French and Belgian civilians were lies. Ponsonby was indeed correct in Falsehood in Wartime that the British newspapers during the war had run many false stories about German atrocities with for example the stories that the Germans routinely cut off the hands of Belgian children having no basis in reality. However, Ponsonby was cavalier and callous in dismissing all of the stories about the massacres of Belgian and French civilians by German forces out of hand as lies. Ponsonby's methodology in Falsehood in Wartime was that if it he could be prove that some of the stories published in the British newspapers about German atrocities in the "Rape of Belgium" were false, then all of the stories about German atrocities must be false. During the war, German newspapers had frequently run stories that accused Belgian and French francs-tireurs of atrocities against German soldiers such as cutting off their hands. Ponsonby did not mention in Falsehood in Wartime that most of the stories in the German newspapers about atrocities by the franc-tireurs were false, thereby leaving the impression it was only the British government and newspapers that had engaged in dishonesty in reporting the news. Ponsonby like many other people in the United Kingdom during the interwar period believed that the Treaty of Versailles was too harsh towards Germany.

The theme in Falsehood in Wartime that all of the reports of German atrocities were fabrications suggested that Germany was not the aggressor nor had Germanhy committed war crimes, which in turn was intended to suggest the Treaty of Versailles was morally wrong. Like many other people at the time, Ponsonby represented the Treaty of Versailles as the result of a quasi-judicial process that resulted in a sort of collective criminal conviction for Germany, and the purpose of Falsehood in Wartime was to prove that Germany had been wrongly "convicted". Falsehood in Wartime was a best-seller when it was published in 1928 because it fitted into the zeitgeist of the 1920s. During the First World War, to justify the sacrifices and suffering imposed by the war, politicians had painted a picture of the post-war world in very utopian terms as the only promise of a better tomorrow provided the necessary hope to sustain the war. When the promised post-war utopia failed to occur after the victory of 1918, there was a strong mood of disenchantment and hurt with the general feeling in the United Kingdom being the expected rewards for wartime suffering had failed to occur and that the promise of a "land fit for heroes" after the war was a cruel joke. In such a climate, a book such as Falsehood in Wartime that portrayed the entire war as the product of a cynical public relations campaign based on duplicity and dishonesty struck a chord. The British historian David Reynolds wrote that Ponsonby in Falsehood in Wartime professed to condemn both sides equally, but in fact almost all of his book was devoted to debunking allegations of German atrocities in the Allied and especially British newspapers while only a few pages were given over to debunking allegations of Allied atrocities in the German newspapers. Reynolds described Falsehood in Wartime as a "polemical" book which despite its claims of neutrality in fact mostly condemned the Allies while portraying Germany as a wronged nation, the victim of lies told by the British newspapers. Reynolds wrote that Ponsonby in Falsehood in Wartime was engaged in the same sort of propaganda that he had denounced in others as he sought to deny that Germany had committed war crimes during the invasion of Belgium and France. Reynolds wrote that many of the stories in the British newspapers at the time such as the claim that the Germans cut off the hands of Belgian children were not true, but that the claim the Germans had massacred thousands of innocent civilians in Belgium and France was not, and Ponsonby was completely wrong when he sought to deny that the "rape of Belgium" had occurred.

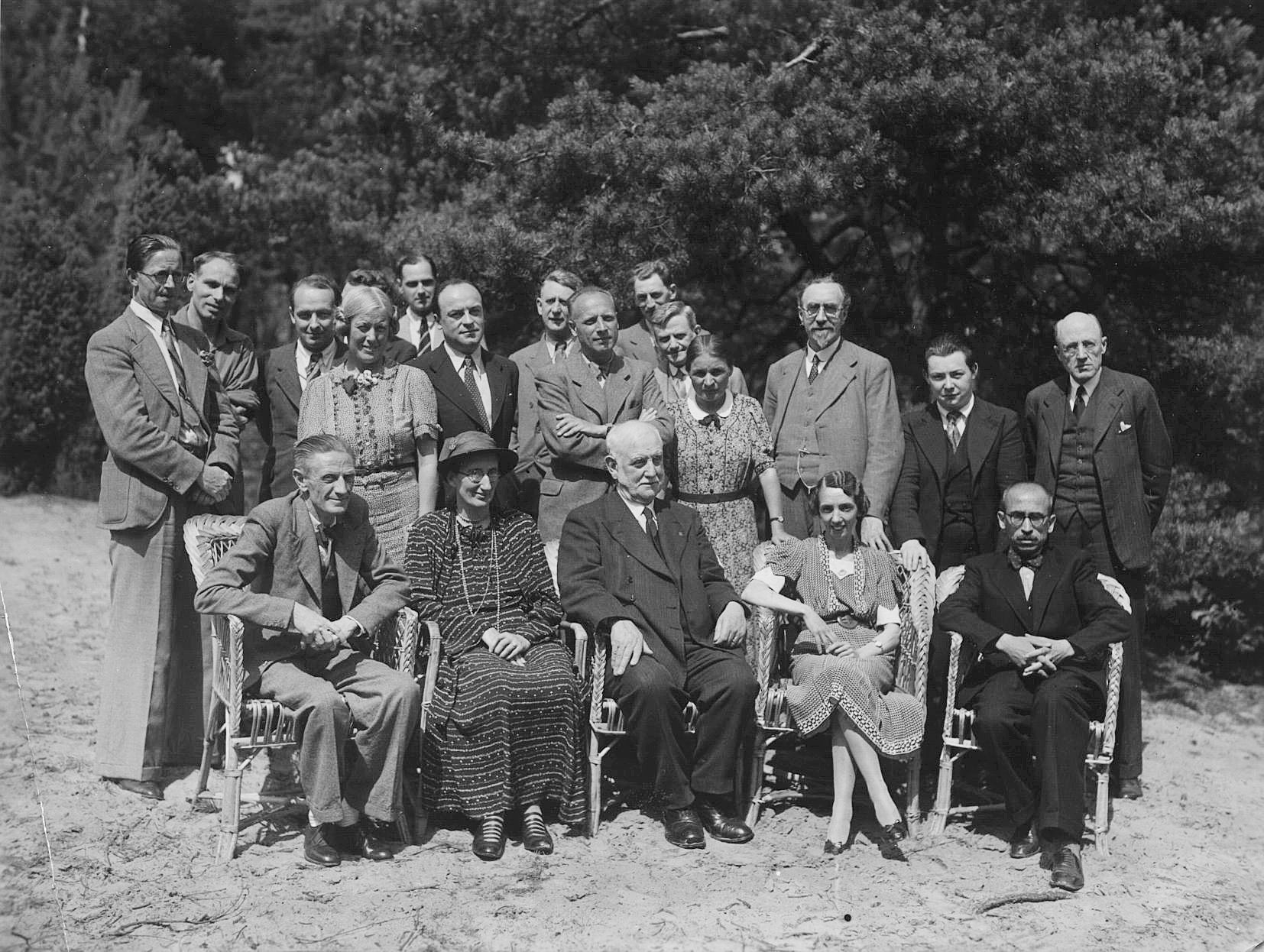
The International Council of the War Resisters' International (WRI), meeting in Broederschapshuis (The Brotherhood House), Bilthoven, Netherlands in July 1938, during the Spanish Civil War. Ponsonby is pictured standing far right in the photograph. Click on the image for further details of people in the photograph.

In 1930, Ponsonby was raised to the peerage as a hereditary baron, taking the title Lord Ponsonby of Shulbrede from his home at Shulbrede Priory in Sussex. He served as leader of the Labour Party in the House of Lords from 1931 until 1935, resigning because he was opposed to the party's support for sanctions against Italy for its invasion of Abyssinia.

In 1937–1938, Ponsonby ran a significant Peace Letter campaign against British preparations for a new war, and from 1936 he was an active member of the Peace Pledge Union, contributing regularly to Peace News.

Ponsonby opposed the initiative of Lord Charnwood and Cosmo Gordon Lang, Archbishop of Canterbury, to ask his Majesty's Government to react against the genocidal Holodomor policies of the Soviet Government.

From 1935 to 1937, he was Chair of the International Council of the War Resisters' International. Ponsonby as the leader of the antiwar wing of the Labour Party was opposed to all wars in principle as evil, which led him to oppose British rearmament in the 1930s. During the Danzig crisis, he spoke out against the British "guarantee" of Poland as likely to cause another world war.

== Resignation ==
In May 1940, Ponsonby resigned from the Labour Party, opposing its decision to join the new coalition government of Winston Churchill.

He wrote a biography of his father which won the James Tait Black Memorial Prize in 1942: Henry Ponsonby, Queen Victoria's Private Secretary: His Life and Letters.

== Death ==
Ponsonby died on 23 March 1946 and was succeeded by his son Matthew Henry Hubert Ponsonby.

== Personal life and family ==
On 12 April 1898, he married Dorothea Parry, daughter of Hubert Parry and Elizabeth Maude Herbert (1851–1933), a daughter of Sidney Herbert, 1st Baron Herbert of Lea. They had a daughter, Elizabeth (1900–1940), who during the 1920s became well known as a leading figure of the Bright Young People, and a son, Matthew (1904–1976), who became the 2nd Baron.

== Arms ==
Coat of arms of Arthur Ponsonby, 1st Baron Ponsonby of Shulbrede
Crest Out of a ducal coronet Azure three arrows, point downwards, one in pale and two in saltire, entwined at the intersection by a snake proper. Escutcheon Gules a chevron between three combs Argent Motto Pro Rege Lege Grege (For The King, The Law, And The People)

== Works ==
- Rebels and Reformers: Biographies for Young People, with Dorothea Ponsonby. New York: H. Holt and Company (1919). OCLC 1051763068.
- The Priory and Manor of Lynchmere and Shulbrede. Taunton: Barnicott and Pearce, and Wessex Press (1920). OCLC 1050747120.
- A Conflict of Opinion, a Discussion on the Failure of the Church. London: Swarthmore Press (1919). OCLC 1042381801.
- The Camel and the Needle's Eye (1910).
- The Decline of the Aristocracy (1912).
- Democracy and Diplomacy (1915)
- Wars And Treaties (1918)
- A Conflict of Opinion: A Discussion on the Failure of the Church (1922)
- English Diaries: A review of English diaries from the sixteenth to the twentieth century with an introduction on diary writing (1923)
- Now Is The Time: An Appeal For Peace (1925)
- More English diaries; further reviews of diaries from the sixteenth to the nineteenth century with an introduction on diary reading, (1927)
- Scottish and Irish Diaries: From the sixteenth to the nineteenth century (1927)
- Falsehood in War-Time (1928).
- Samuel Pepys (1928)
- British diarists (1930) (80-page booklet in the "Benn's Sixpenny Library" series, no. 70)
- Casual Observations (1930)
- John Evelyn: Fellow of the Royal Society: author of "Sylva" (1933)
- Life Here And Now: conclusions derived From an examination of the sense of duration (1936)
- The little torch: Quotations from diaries of the past for every day of the year (1938)
- Henry Ponsonby, Queen Victoria's Private Secretary: His Life from his Letters (1942)

== See also ==
- Ponsonby Rule

== Notes ==
=== Bibliography ===
- Jones, Raymond A. (1989). Arthur Ponsonby: The Politics of Life. Helm.
- Kidd, Charles, and David Williamson, eds (1990). Debrett's Peerage and Baronetage. New York: St. Martin's Press.
- Horne, John; Kramer, Alan (2001). German Atrocities, 1914 A History of Denial. New Haven: Yale University Press. ISBN 0-300-08975-9.
- Reynolds, David (2014). The Long Shadow: The Legacies of the Great War in the Twentieth Century. New York: W.W. Norton. ISBN 9780393244298.
- Towle, Philip (2009). Going to War British Debates from Wilberforce to Blair. London: Palgrave Macmillan UK. ISBN 9780230234314.
- Leigh Rayment's Peerage Pages
- Leigh Rayment's Historical List of MPs

Court offices
Preceded by Albert Wellesley	Page of Honour; 1882–1887	Succeeded by Victor Wellesley
Parliament of the United Kingdom
Preceded by Sir Henry Campbell-Bannerman	Member of Parliament for Stirling Burghs; 1908–1918	Constituency abolished
Preceded by Sir Tudor Walters	Member of Parliament for Sheffield Brightside; 1922–1930	Succeeded by Fred Marshall
Political offices
Preceded by Ronald McNeill	Parliamentary Under-Secretary of State for Foreign Affairs; 1924	Succeeded by Ronald McNeill
Preceded by The Earl of Plymouth	Under-Secretary of State for Dominion Affairs; 1929	Succeeded by William Lunn
Preceded by The Earl Russell	Parliamentary Secretary to the Ministry of Transport; 1929–1931	Succeeded by John Allen Parkinson
Preceded by Clement Attlee	Chancellor of the Duchy of Lancaster; 1931	Succeeded by The Marquess of Lothian
Party political offices
Preceded by The Lord Parmoor	Leader of the Labour Party in the House of Lords; 1931–1935	Succeeded by The Lord Snell
Non-profit organization positions
Preceded by Fenner Brockway	Chair of War Resisters' International; 1934–1937	Succeeded by George Lansbury
Peerage of the United Kingdom
New creation	Baron Ponsonby of Shulbrede; 1930–1946	Succeeded by Matthew Henry Hubert Ponsonby
