= Agnes Muriel Clay =

British historian and writer (1878–1962)

Agnes Muriel Clay (1878–1962) was an English historian and writer. A classics tutor at Lady Margaret Hall, Clay wrote Roman law articles for the Encyclopædia Britannica Eleventh Edition and published Sources for Roman History B.C. 133–70 with Abel Hendy Jones Greenidge.

== Career ==
After attending Francis Holland School, Clay studied Classics at Lady Margaret Hall, Oxford (LMH), graduating with a first class degree. In 1903, she co-authored Sources for Roman History B.C. 133–70 with Abel Hendy Jones Greenidge. Clay became a Classics tutor at LMH. She was a member of the Association for the Higher Education of Women, which promoted women's education in Oxford. In 1920, Clay was appointed a governor of the Frances Mary Buss Schools for Girls. From 1928 to 1945, Clay was the Honorary Secretary and Treasure of the Oxford Mission to Calcutta.

Clay contributed to thirteen articles in the Encyclopædia Britannica Eleventh Edition, published in 1911. Her articles on Roman Law made her the only female author of a Classics entry in that edition of the encyclopedia, and one of 34 female contributors out of 1500 authors.

== Personal life ==
Clay was the daughter of a London barrister and had two brothers. She married Edward Wilde in 1910, and he died in 1931.
