= Elizabeth Ponsonby =

English aristocrat

The Honourable Elizabeth Ponsonby
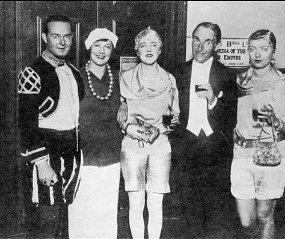
- Ponsonby (middle) with William Acton, Margot Bendir, Harry Melville, and Babe Plunket-Greene at David Tennant's party, 1928
- Born: 28 December 1900; London, England
- Died: 31 July 1940 (aged 39)
- Spouse: Denis Cavendish Pelly (m. 1929; div. 1933)
- Parents: Arthur Ponsonby (father); Dolly Parry (mother)
- Relatives: Matthew Ponsonboy (brother); Henry Ponsonby (grandfather); Hubert Parry (grandfather); David Plunket Greene (cousin)

Elizabeth Ponsonby (28 December 1900 – 31 July 1940) was an English aristocrat who was a prominent member of the Bright Young Things, well-connected socialites who featured heavily in the contemporary tabloid press for what were perceived to be their hedonistic antics.

The daughter of Arthur Ponsonby, diplomat and Foreign Office minister, later created Baron Ponsonby of Shulbrede, Elizabeth was born at 9 Victoria Square, London. She descended from the Ponsonby Earls of Bessborough. Her mother, Dolly (1876–1963), was daughter of the composer Hubert Parry. David Plunket Greene was her cousin.

Alongside Babe Plunket-Greene, Brian Howard and Edward Gathorne-Hardy, Ponsonby was considered to be one of the leaders of the group. Her father was displeased by her notoriety, commenting "I think she is made for better things" and regretting that she was "famous for her extravagant pranks".

Her 1929 marriage to (John) Denis Cavendish Pelly, an assistant in a Bond Street gramophone shop later employed by the Gas Light and Coke Company, son of Major William Francis Henry Pelly of the Royal Inniskilling Fusiliers and descendant of Sir John Pelly, 1st Baronet, was dissolved in 1933, and Ponsonby later entered a relationship with garage proprietor John Ludovic ('Ludy') Ford. She died in 1940, according to her brother, Matthew, of alcoholism.

Ponsonby was a model for Agatha Runcible in Evelyn Waugh's novel Vile Bodies.
