= Baron Ponsonby of Shulbrede =

Title in the Peerage of the United Kingdom

Arthur Ponsonby

Baron Ponsonby of Shulbrede, of Shulbrede in the County of Sussex, is a title in the Peerage of the United Kingdom. It was created in 1930 for the politician Arthur Ponsonby. Ponsonby was the third son of General Sir Henry Ponsonby and the great-grandson of Frederick Ponsonby, 3rd Earl of Bessborough. Frederick Ponsonby, 1st Baron Sysonby, was his elder brother. The first Baron's grandson, the third Baron, was also a Labour politician and notably served as Opposition Chief Whip in the House of Lords in the 1980s. As of 2017 the title is held by the latter's only son, the fourth Baron, who succeeded in 1990. He sat on the Labour benches in the House of Lords prior to the passing of the House of Lords Act 1999, when he lost his seat. However, in 2000 he was given a life peerage as Baron Ponsonby of Roehampton, of Shulbrede in the County of West Sussex, and was able to retake his seat in the House of Lords.

The family seat is Shulbrede Priory, near Linchmere, West Sussex.

== Barons Ponsonby of Shulbrede (1930) ==
- Arthur Augustus William Harry Ponsonby, 1st Baron Ponsonby of Shulbrede (1871–1946)
- Matthew Henry Hubert Ponsonby, 2nd Baron Ponsonby of Shulbrede (1904–1976)
- Thomas Arthur Ponsonby, 3rd Baron Ponsonby of Shulbrede (1930–1990)
- Frederick Matthew Thomas Ponsonby, 4th Baron Ponsonby of Shulbrede (b. 1958)

The heir apparent is the present holder's son, the Hon. Cameron John Jackson Ponsonby (b. 1995)

== Arms ==
Coat of arms of Baron Ponsonby of Shulbrede
Crest Out of a ducal coronet Azure three arrows, point downwards, one in pale and two in saltire, entwined at the intersection by a snake proper. Escutcheon Gules a chevron between three combs Argent Motto Pro Rege Lege Grege (For The King, The Law, And The People)

== See also ==
- Earl of Bessborough
- Baron de Mauley
- Baron Ponsonby of Imokilly
- Baron Sysonby
- Lady Caroline Ponsonby
