= Terence Lucy Greenidge =

British actor and writer (1902–1970)

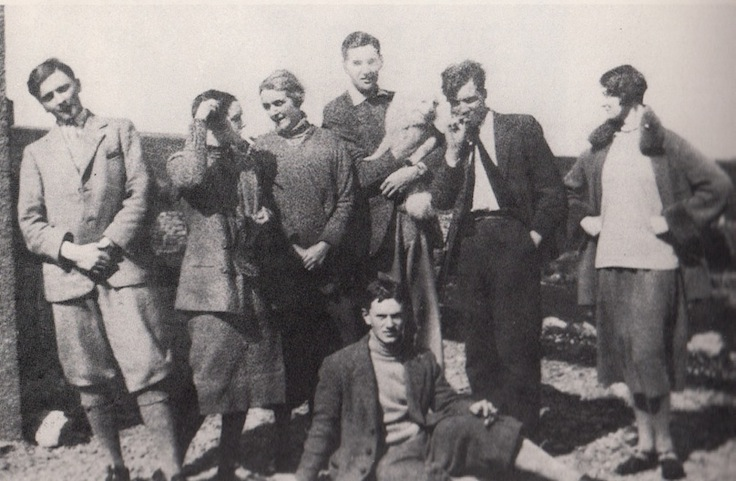
Richard Plunket Greene, first from the left, Olivia Plunket Greene, second from left, David Plunket Greene, holding the dog, Terence Lucy Greenidge, smoking, second from right, Elizabeth Frances Russell, first from the right, Evelyn Waugh, sitting down

Terence Lucy Greenidge (14 January 1902 – 18 December 1970) was an English writer and actor. A friend of Evelyn Waugh, whom he met at Oxford, the two collaborated in producing the Scarlet Woman: An Ecclesiastical Melodrama. Evelyn Waugh in Letters (edited by Charles E. Linck) was published posthumously in 1994, which details many of Greenidge's recollections of Evelyn Waugh.

== Early life ==
Greenidge was the second son of Abel Hendy Jones Greenidge (who came up to study and remained at Oxford as an academic), of a family resident on Barbados since 1635, and his wife Edith Elizabeth, the youngest daughter of William Lucy, at that time the sole owner of Lucy Ironworks, previously known as the Eagle Ironworks, in Walton Well Road, Jericho, Oxford. Terence's parents died within a year of each other in 1906/07 and the young Terence was brought up by his guardian/godfather, Dr. Rev. Henry Herbert Williams, who went on to become Bishop of Carlisle between 1920 and 1947. He went to Dragon School in Oxford, before going up to Rugby School between 1915 and 1920. He won a scholarship to Hertford College, Oxford where he read Classics and obtained a second in Honours Moderns and a second in Greats. The Trustee of his father’s will was the bursar at Hertford. At Oxford, he was one of the founding members of the Hypocrites' Club and kept friends with Evelyn and Alec Waugh and introducing them to the club.

In 1924, Terence, his brother John Greenidge, Evelyn Waugh, and John Sutro, the film producer whom Terence knew at Rugby School, contributed £5 each to purchase a cine-camera and started filming the Scarlet Woman: An Ecclesiastical Melodrama, a collaboration that would only yield a small dividend, some forty-two years later, to John Sutro and Terence Greenidge, since by then his brother John Greenidge (October 1953) and Evelyn Waugh (April 1966) had died.

== Written works ==
Title	Date	Publisher
Degenerate Oxford? A critical study of modern University life	1930	Chapman & Hall
The Magnificent	1933	Fortune Press
Brass and Paint: a patriotic story	1934	Chapman & Hall
Tinpot Country: a story of England in the Dark Ages	1937	Fortune Press
Philip and the Dictator	1938	Fortune Press
Ten Poems, mostly amorous	1948	B. M. Hagel
Girls and Stations	1948	Fortune Press
Four Plays for Pacifists	1955	Strickland Press
Evelyn Waugh in Letters (editor, Charles E. Linck)	1994	Cow Hill Press, Texas

Brass and Paint, together with The Magnificent, were among several books published by the Fortune Press to be seized by the police in 1934 and successfully prosecuted for obscene libel.

== Acting career ==
As well as being a playwright, Greenidge was an actor although he only played smaller roles on stage and television. His first television role came in the BBC period drama The Diary of Samuel Pepys, playing the role of Sir George Carteret. He was still acting at the Royal Shakespeare Theatre at Stratford-on-Avon until three years before his death in 1970.

== Filmography ==
Year	Title	Role	Notes
1930	The Middle Watch		
1931	Potiphar's Wife	Minor role	Uncredited
1933	The Road to Hell	Elder Son	Uncredited
1953	The Beggar's Opera	Chaplain	
1955	Richard III	Scrivener	
1968	A Midsummer Night's Dream	Attendant	(final film role)
