= Vile Bodies =

1930 novel by Evelyn Waugh

- Jacket of the first UK edition of Vile Bodies
- Author: Evelyn Waugh
- Language: English
- Genre: Novel, satire
- Set in: England, late 1920s
- Publisher: Chapman & Hall
- Publication date: 1930
- Publication place: United Kingdom
- Media type: Print (hardback & paperback)
- Pages: 254
- ISBN: 0-14-118287-3
- OCLC: 42700827
- Dewey Decimal: 823.912
- LC Class: PR6045 .A97
- Preceded by: Decline and Fall
- Followed by: Black Mischief

Vile Bodies is the second novel by Evelyn Waugh, published in 1930. It satirises London's post-First World War "bright young things" and the press coverage around them. Waugh originally considered the title Bright Young Things but changed it; the published title echoes a narrator's remark on crowds and parties: "Those vile bodies."

The book was dedicated to B. G. and D. G., Waugh's friends Bryan Guinness and his wife Diana.

== Plot ==
Adam Symes has a novel to finish and, with the proceeds, plans to marry Nina Blount. Returning from France, he has his manuscript impounded as obscene by customs officers, while in the next room his friend Agatha Runcible is strip searched as a suspected jewel thief. She rings the newspapers about her fate. Adam rings Nina to say he cannot now marry her, and has to negotiate a penal new contract with his publisher.

Winning £1,000 on a bet, Adam gives it to a drunk major to place on a horse, but the major disappears. After a fancy dress party, where he meets up with Nina and Agatha, the young people go back to the home of a quiet girl who turns out to be the Prime Minister's daughter. Agatha, who is in Hawaiian costume, is kicked out, to the delight of press photographers. The implication of orgies at 10 Downing Street causes the collapse of the government.

Nina suggests that Adam ask her widowed father in the country for money to marry on. The eccentric old man comes up with a cheque for £1,000 and, in celebration, Adam takes Nina to a country hotel to claim her virginity. She claims not to have enjoyed it, and also points out to Adam that the signature on the cheque reads Charlie Chaplin.

The next big party in London is being held by Margot Metroland, whose private business is recruiting girls for Latin American brothels, and will feature an American lady evangelist with her choir of female angels. The party is crashed by Simon Balcairn, a friend of Adam's who is a gossip columnist, but Simon is kicked out and in despair gasses himself.

Simon's job is offered to Adam, who initially devotes much of his column to the exploits of his friends but finds he can only broaden the scope by invention. A dim childhood friend of Nina is transformed in dashing man-about-town Ginger Littlejohn. Still unable to marry, Nina suggests another attempt at her father. Adam finds the old man involved in the shooting of an historical film on his estate and comes away empty-handed.

While he was away, he got Nina and other friends to write his column, for which he is sacked. With friends, Adam goes to some motor races where he sees the drunk major, who says he has got Adam's winnings but then disappears. A drunk Agatha takes off in a racing car and crashes with serious injuries, from which she later dies.

Nina announces that she is engaged to Ginger. Later Ginger confronts Adam with "serious talk" about Nina, in response to which the jobless, penniless and defeated Adam jokingly proposes to "sell his share in her" and settles for £78/16/2 in order to pay an hotel bill. The nuptial pair fly off to France for their honeymoon, but Ginger is unable to join Nina for Christmas at the house of her father, who he has not yet met. Adam steps into the breach, sharing a bedroom as Nina's husband and watching her father's maladroit film.

War breaks out, in which Adam finds himself alone on a devastated battlefield in France. He comes across the drunk major, now a general, who still has his winnings (although heavily devalued now) and invites him to champagne in his staff car. There they find one of the evangelist's angels, back in Europe after her experiences in the South American entertainment industry. While general and angel flirt, an exhausted Adam falls asleep.

== Characters ==
- Adam Fenwick-Symes, an aspiring novelist
- Nina Blount, his on-and-off fiancée
- Ginger Littlejohn, eventual husband of Nina
- Colonel Blount, eccentric father of Nina
- The Drunken Major
- Lottie Crump, owner of a private hotel
- Agatha Runcible, wild party girl, said to be based on Elizabeth Ponsonby
- Simon Balcairn, depressive gossip columnist
- Miles Maitland, gay partygoer
- Margot Maitland, society hostess and procuress
- Mrs Melrose Ape, American evangelist

== Style ==
Critics have noted the novel’s fragmented scenes, jump-cuts and telephone dialogue, often linking its method to cinema and to modernist effects. The book shifts in tone from light-hearted romp to bleak desolation. Waugh himself later wrote that the tone shifts reflected the breakdown of his first marriage halfway through the book's composition. Some have defended the novel's downbeat ending as a poetically just reversal of the conventions of comic romance.

== Reception and influence ==
David Bowie cited the novel as the primary influence in writing his song "Aladdin Sane".

== Adaptations ==
An audio adaptation starring John Standing and Lynn Redgrave was broadcast on BBC Radio 4 in October 1970 and repeated on BBC Radio 4 Extra in March 2026.

A film adaptation, titled Bright Young Things, was released in 2003, written and directed by Stephen Fry.
