= Rital literature =

Belgian literature written by Italian immigrants

Rital Literature
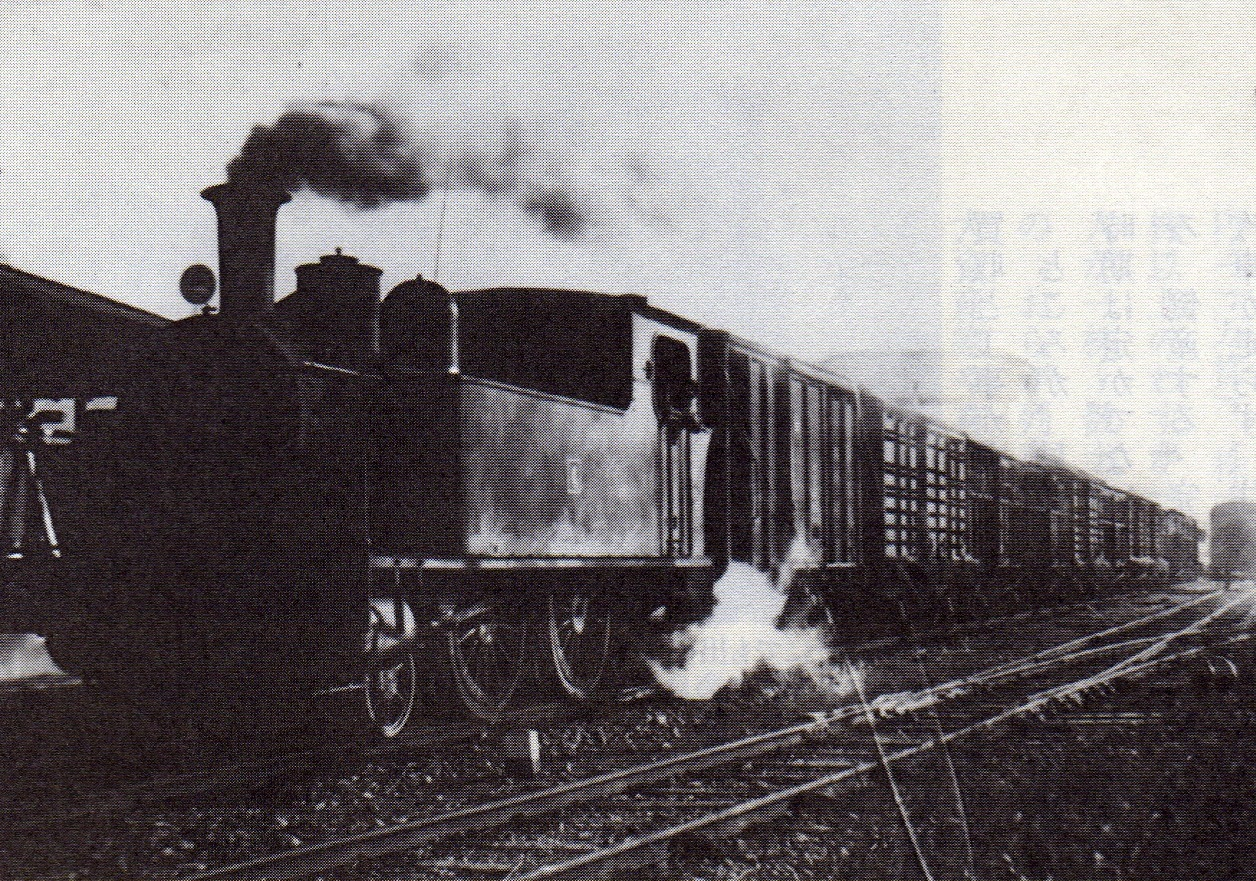
- Cultural origins: Italy and Belgium
- Features: Literary Movement in Belgian Literature
- Authors: Tony Santocono

Related genres
- Migrant Literature

Rital Literature is a category in Belgian literature indicating literary works written by Italian immigrants in Belgium. The original term in French is "litérature rital" and was coined by Anne Morelli for an anthology that brings together the authors of this category. It includes Italian migrant writers who produced literary works after the Second World War.

== Origin of the term ==
The term "rital" is a popular slang term that defines a person who is Italian or of Italian origin. Much less used nowadays although still notable, this insult is characteristic of anti-Italian xenophobia, as well as "macaroni", or "spaghetti", two kinds of Italian pasta which terms were used to refer pejoratively to Italian immigrants. However, the song "Le Rital" by Claude Barzotti, has greatly reduced its pejorative side. It is a popular song sung by an author from the second generation of Italian immigrants. He reverses the pejorative meaning of the term "rital" to use it proudly.

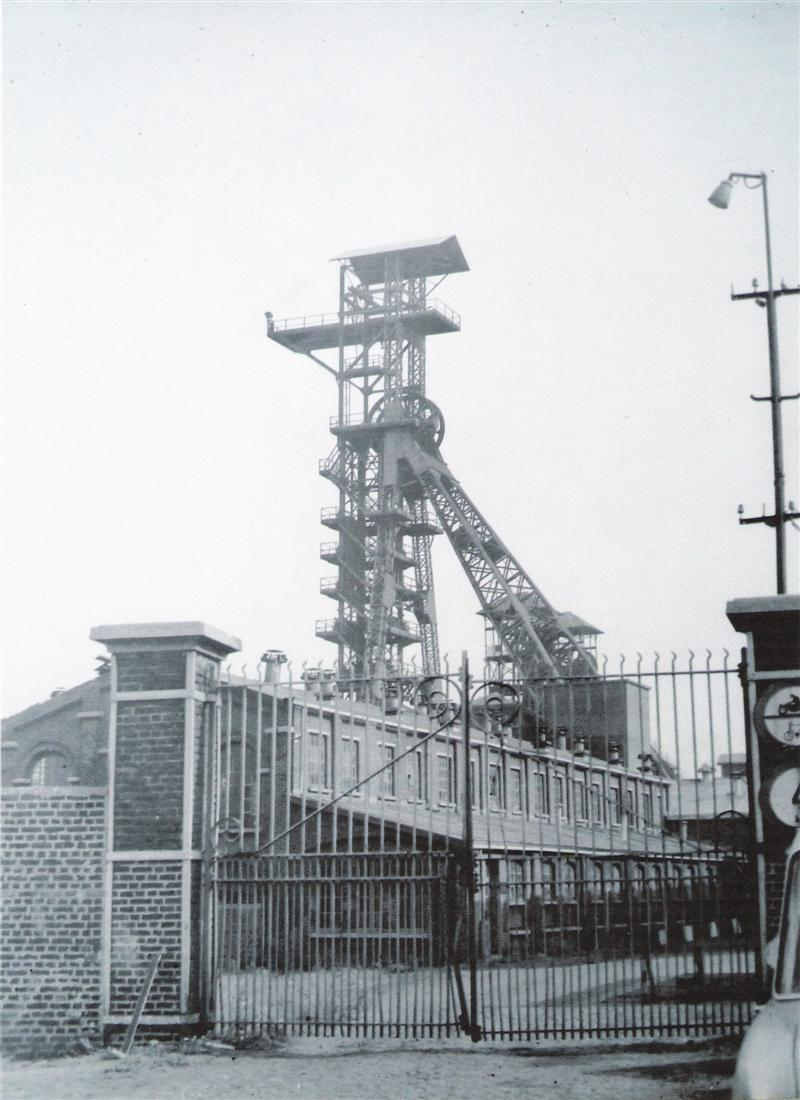
Coal mining in Hainaut, Belgium.

This name was given to the Italian immigrant workers who arrived before and after the Second World War to work in France, Belgium and Switzerland. Italy had an agreement with these three countries to send them guest workers. With Belgium, it was a bilateral agreement stating that Belgium would send to Italy 200 kilograms of coal per guest Italian worker per day. The term "rital" originates from the immigrants' official papers where the letters "R.ital." (for "Réfugié italien", which means Italian refugee in French) were written.

The literature of Italian immigrants in Belgium has aroused the interest of several literary scholars. The most notable of these is Anne Morelli, on whose initiative an anthology of authors of the second generation of Italian immigration in Belgium has been compiled, the Rital-Littérature. Anthologie de la littérature des Italiens en Belgique. The origin of the term "rital-literature" is her own. This anthology brings together writers regardless of genre and social status.

Massimo Bortolini's article Production littéraire des Italiens de Belgique depuis 1945 is another example of this desire to bring together authors of Italian origin in Belgium. Toni Santocono has long been considered the literary spokesman for the Italian community in Belgium.

== Characteristics of the rital literature ==
Migration has long interested researchers, especially in political science, sociology and anthropology. It is only recently that it has also found a place in literary studies: cultural transfers in a migratory context lead to complex discursive exchanges. They may result in hybrid forms in literary genres, adopted language, topography or postures of enunciation. Literary expression in migrant literature does not always derive of an autobiographical purpose, although scholars have tended to privilege the author's life in their research.

The authors who are considered part of the Rital literature are those who have written after 1946, the date of the coal agreement. Their citizenship does not matter; they can be Italian or Belgian. Language does not matter either: works are written in Belgium's two main languages, French and Dutch, but also in Italian, in Italian dialects or the Walloon dialect. The Walloon dialect could be considered a lingua franca in the mines at the time.

A notable fact about migrant literature in general, and " rital " literature in particular, is the partition of literary genres between the first generation of immigration and the second. The first has a tendency to write poetry or testimonials, often recollections of traumatic events. The second generation, on the other hand, is characterized by a longer educational journey than their parents, and prefers genres such as the novel and theater. Recurring themes in their works are the myth of origins and the construction of identity.

The percentage of immigrant Italians who have produced a literary work is significantly high. There are some explanations for this phenomenon: generally, the transition from one reality to another prompts authors to talk about the change they are experiencing. Writing may have been the migrant's first companion after a material and cultural shock. Moreover, it may represent a conquest of a new environment, which is essential to an identity in formation. It may also be an attempt at self-repair after a crisis due to the shock of uprooting. In any case, a large part of the literary production of Italians in Belgium often translates the experience of being in the situation of in-between, straddling two cultures.

Furthermore, the proportion of working-class writers in Rital literature is particularly high.

=== Italian Migrant Identity ===
One of the most important characteristics of the Rital literature is the formation of the literary identity. In social sciences terms, immigrant identity stands as foreign to the collective identities of the host country and country of origin. It then becomes an almost empty identity, with truncated references or on which it cannot rely, because these references belong to the collective identities of the host country or the country of origin. To avoid a double mechanism of identity loss, the immigrant must balance his identity between these two poles.

According to the social sciences, identity is generally polarized in two points, antinomian but also complementary, that organize our identity: similarity and alterity. In childhood and early adolescence, we seek similarity, make our own models from our entourage, with the goal of recognizing ourselves in others. Thus, we bring together a series of identifications. Then, we differentiate ourselves with certain signals, looking for otherness in others but also in ourselves.

Thus, there is an individual part of identity and a collective part. It is through the recognition of similar traits with a group that the collective part is built, and this group signals itself with internal common traits, but also with different traits from outside. The individual part of the identity, on the other hand, is constructed through the recognition of traits different from the collective identity. It is in the interdependence of these two aspects that identity is created.

One of the most recurrent themes in Rital literature is the formation of identity and the identitary discourse. In identitary discourse, the individual and collective parts function together: because, without a collective background, individual identity discourse does not exist. For the immigrants, there is an interference between similarity and otherness. On the one hand, the collective identity must be sought in a foreign community. On the other hand, the individual identity must be found in a double gap with the two collective identities, that is, of the host country and the country of origin, all of which refer to adversity. An identitary discourse based on a plural identity is created, with a gap to be filled.

Furthermore, the migrant status is renewed for the second generation of immigration, by the way we name it. For this generation, the collective identity of origin is only a trace, a fragment. This is why the identitary discourse of the second generation relies, more than the first, on alterity.

== Main literary works ==
- François Cavanna, Les Ritals (1978), novel
- Pierre Milza, Voyage en Ritalie (1993), novel
- M. Giuliani, Le Fils d'un rital (2006), novel
- Nicole Malinconi, Da Solo (1997), novel
- Nicole Malinconi, À l'Étranger (2003), novel
- Toni Santocono, Rue des Italiens (1986), novel

== Other cultural works ==
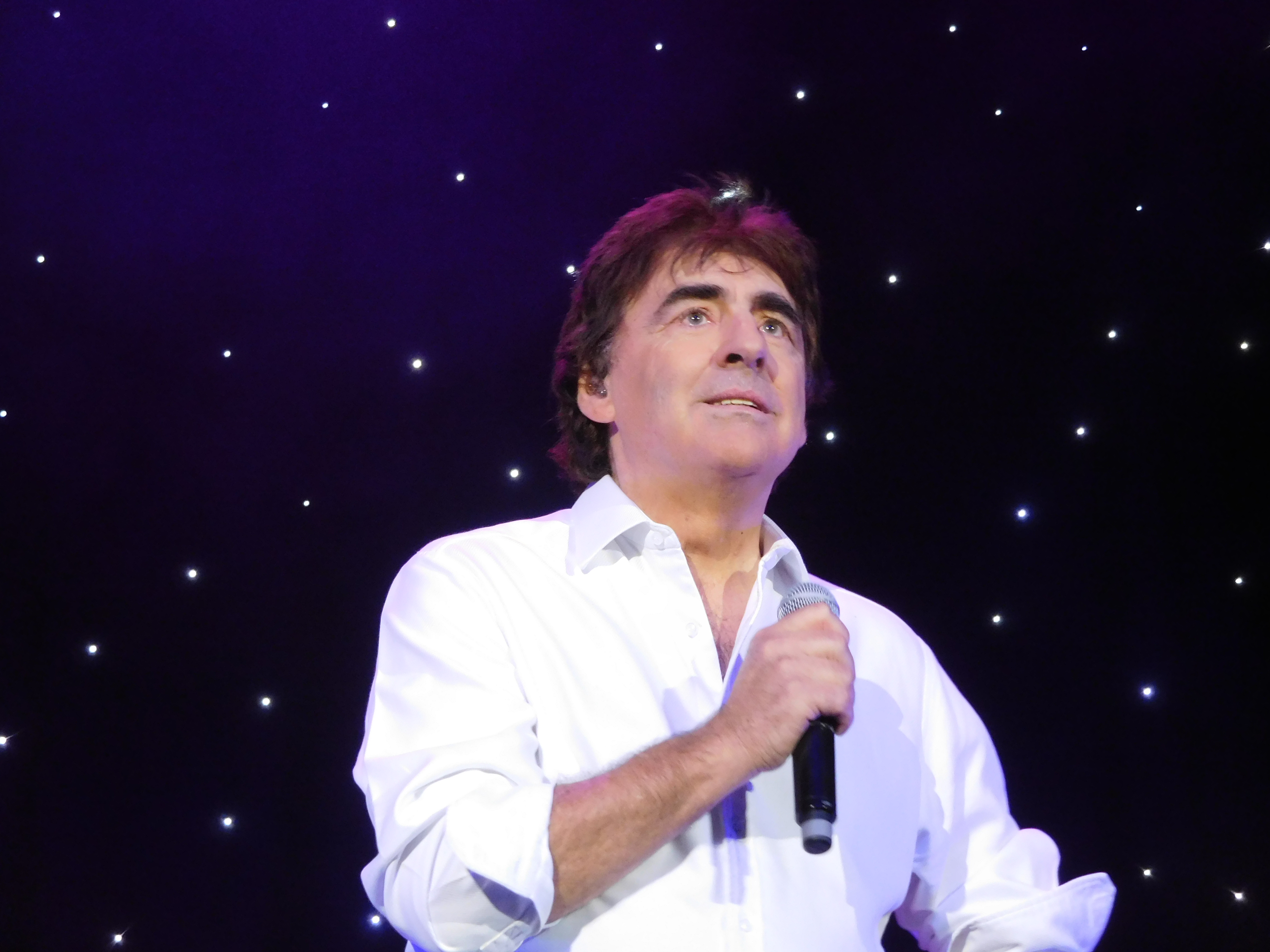
Claude Barzotti

In 2015, Ritals, a Web series by Svevo Moltrasio, was produced on the theme of Italian migrants.

Songs are another area where the term "rital" was used by Italian migrants in francophone countries to affirm their migrant identity:

- Claude Barzotti, Le Rital (1983)
- Gianmaria Testa, Ritals (2006)
- Tedua, Rital (2018)

== See also ==
- Belgian literature
- Migrant literature
- French literature
- Italian diaspora
- François Cavanna
- Nicole Malinconi
- Claude Barzotti
- Anne Morelli

== Bibliography ==
- Cavanna, François (1978). Les Ritals (in French). Paris: Belfond.
- Santocono, Toni (1986), Rue des Italiens (in French), Mons: Editions du Cerisier.
- Laronde, Michel (1993), Autour du Roman Beur. Immigration et Identité (in French), Paris: L'Harmattan.
- Bonn, Charles (1995), Littératures des immigrations. Un espace littéraire émergent (in French), vol. 1, Paris: L'Harmattan.
- Bortolini, Massimo (1995), Production littéraire des Italiens de Belgique depuis 1945 (in French), Paris: L'Harmattan.
- Milza, Pierre (1995), Voyage en Ritalie (in French), Paris: Payot.
- CESDEI (1996), Rital-Littérature. Anthologie de la littérature des Italiens en Belgique, Mons: Editions du Cerisier.
- Malinconi, Nicole (1997), Da Solo (in French), Brussels: Les Eperonniers.
- Clersy, Christophe (1998). Tony Santocono et la rital-Littérature : un nouvel âge littéraire ? (in French). Liège: University of Liège.
- Deprez, Marcel (1998). "Siamo tutti neri !" : des hommes contre du charbon (in French). Seraing: Institut d'histoire ouvrière, économique et sociale.
- Bade, Klause (2003). Migrations in European History. Malden: Blackwell Publishing.
- Malinconi, Nicole (2003). À l'Étranger (in French). Stavelot: Le Grand Miroir.
- Giuliani, M. (2006). Le Fils d'un Rital (in French). ISBN 2908196891.
- Galloro, Piero-D. (30 November 2017). ""Je suis rital et je le reste…" Expertise de l'inclusion italienne (en)chantée ou la transformation spectaculaire d'un monstre". Volume! La revue des musiques populaires. 12 (1): 35–53. Archived from the original on 2022-06-08 – via OpenEdition Journals.
- "Rital". Wikipedia français. 8 June 2022. Archived from the original on 8 June 2022.
- "second-generation migrant". European Commission. 8 June 2022. Archived from the original on 8 June 2022.
