= Falsehood in War-Time =

Book written in 1928 by Arthur Ponsonby, about World War I propaganda

Falsehood in War-time, Containing an Assortment of Lies Circulated Throughout the Nations During the Great War
- Author: Arthur Ponsonby
- Language: English
- Genre: Non-fiction
- Publisher: Garland Publishing Company
- Publication date: 1928
- Publication place: United Kingdom

Falsehood in War-time, Containing an Assortment of Lies Circulated Throughout the Nations During the Great War is a 1928 book by Arthur Ponsonby, listing and refuting pieces of propaganda used by the Allied Forces (Russia, France, Britain and the United States) against the Central Powers (Germany, Austria-Hungary, Turkey and Bulgaria).

After the Second World War, a new edition of the book was given the updated title Falsehood in War-Time: Propaganda Lies of the First World War.

== Arthur Ponsonby ==
Arthur Ponsonby, 1st Baron Ponsonby of Shulbrede, was born Arthur Augustus William Harry Ponsonby in 1871. Lord Ponsonby attended Eton College and Balliol College, Oxford, after which he joined the Diplomatic Service. In 1906, Ponsonby ran as a Liberal candidate, unsuccessfully, at the general election but was elected a Member of Parliament of the United Kingdom (MP) at a by-election in 1908.

Lord Ponsonby was opposed to Britain's involvement in World War I and helped form the Union of Democratic Control (UDC). He stood as an "Independent Democrat" in the new Dunfermline Burghs constituency in the 1918 general election and was defeated, and joined the Labour Party, becoming the MP for the Brightside Division of Sheffield in the 1922 general election. He was appointed Parliamentary Secretary to the Ministry of Transport after the 1929 general election. He was granted a peerage and became Leader of the House of Lords in 1930.

In 1940, Lord Ponsonby resigned from the Labour Party because he was opposed to its decision to join the coalition government of Winston Churchill.

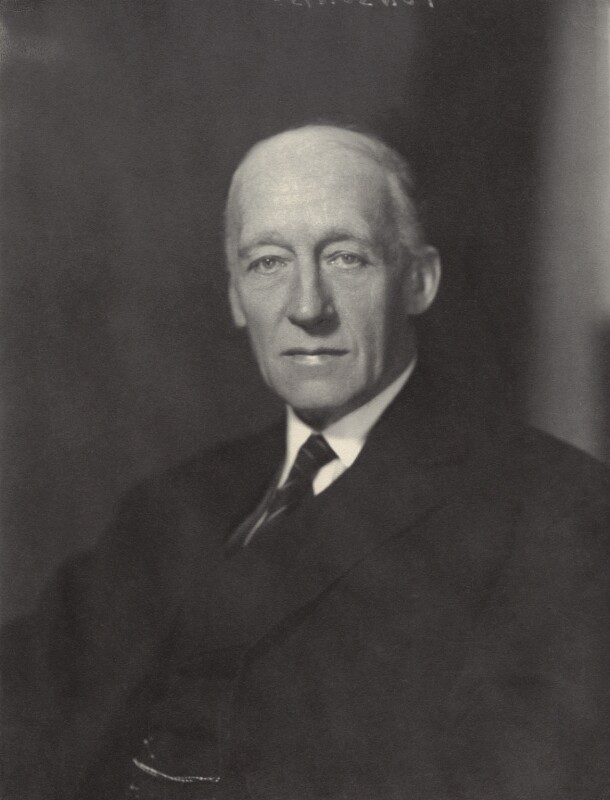
Lord Ponsonby

== Summary ==
Falsehood in War-time identifies the role propaganda played in World War I in general and specific terms and lists more than 20 falsehoods that were circulated during the First World War. Ponsonby regarded these falsehoods as a fundamental part of the way the war effort was created and sustained, stating that without lies there would be "no reason and no will for war".

In detail, Ponsonby analyses the case of the invasion of Belgium as a cause of the war, the claim of Germany's sole responsibility, the myth of a nurse mutilated by German soldiers, the depiction of the German Emperor as a criminal, the case of a Belgian baby whose hands were cut off, the Leuven altarpiece which had allegedly been destroyed by Germans, the baby of Courbeck Loo, the crucified Canadian soldier, the German Corpse Factory, the German U-boat outrage, the case of the sinking of the Lusitania, atrocity stories reported on German Army troops which were reported killing and maiming of innocent civilians and captured soldiers, faked photographs, the doctoring of official documents, and the "hypocritical" indignation.

As to the Song of the Germans, base for the later German national anthem of the Weimar Republic (since 1922): "Deutschland über alles in der Welt" (Germany above everything in the world), Ponsonby said it was popularly accepted as meaning, "[Let] Germany [rule] over every country in the world", i.e. the German domination of the world. However, German grammar distinguishes between über Alles (i.e. more important than everything else) and über alle, meaning "on top of everybody". According to Ponsonby, the latter misleading translation was chosen by the Allies during both World Wars for propaganda purposes.

== Reception and significance ==
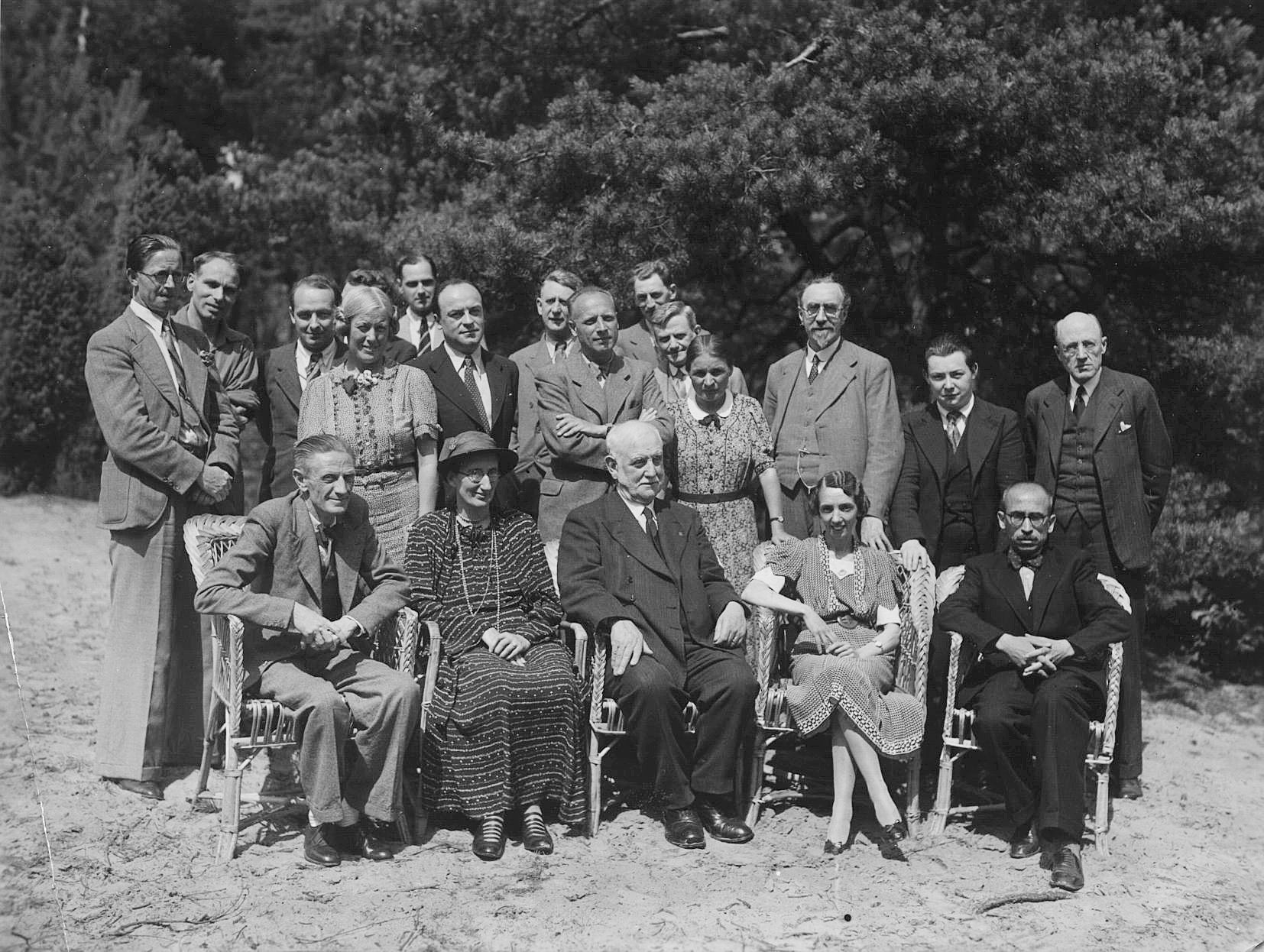
The International Council of the War Resisters' International (WRI), meeting in Broederschapshuis (The Brotherhood House), Bilthoven, Netherlands in July 1938, during the Spanish Civil War. Ponsonby is pictured standing far right in the photograph. Click on the image for further details of people in the photograph.

Falsehood in War-Time was positively received on its release. The International Journal of Ethics calls Ponsonby's work "an interesting study of the moral degradation involved in all wars." In addition, the World Tomorrow welcomed the book as a direct way of describing propaganda in World War One and states it is, "decidedly to the good". One of Ponsonby's critics, The Times of London, mentioned Ponsonby omitted the Bryce report. However, The Times recognized that Ponsonby's writing "is a useful warning against undue credulity". The reception of the book in Germany was positive, where the German Foreign Ministry regarded it as the "best and most effective book... against war atrocity lies" and helped get it translated into French and German.

Anne Morelli systematised the essential propaganda techniques of Ponsonby's work in her book Principes élémentaires de propagande de guerre. Morelli explains how these principles not only worked during the First World War, but were also applied in wars into 2001.

1. We do not want war.
2. The opposite party alone is guilty of war.
3. The enemy is inherently evil and resembles the devil.
4. We defend a noble cause, not our own interests.(Just war theory)
5. The enemy commits atrocities on purpose; our mishaps are involuntary.
6. The enemy uses forbidden weapons.
7. We suffer small losses, those of the enemy are enormous.
8. Recognized artists and intellectuals back our cause.
9. Our cause is sacred.
10. All who doubt our propaganda are traitors.

In his book The Last Great War: British Society and the First World War, Adrian Gregory criticised what he saw as methodological errors within Falsehood in War-Time. He wrote that, in some instances, Ponsonby incorrectly charged the British press as manufacturing stories that actually derived from various other sources including rumours, urban myths and German propaganda. He concluded, "material from American isolationist sources, the British pacifist press and even from Germany is taken as truth, British official pronouncements and the British press are assumed to be lying. His book is not an inquiry into propaganda; it is propaganda, of the most passionate sort: Exposure may therefore be useful, even when the struggle is over, in order to show up the fraud, hypocrisy and humbug on which all war rests".

== Quotations ==
The psychological factor in war is just as important as the military factor. The morale of civilians, as well as of soldiers, must be kept up to the mark. The War Offices, Admiralties, and Air Ministries look after the military side. Departments have to be created to see to the psychological side. People must never be allowed to become despondent; so victories must be exaggerated and defeats, if not concealed, at any rate minimized, and the stimulus of indignation, horror, and hatred must be assiduously and continuously pumped into the public mind by means of "propaganda."

...a Government which has decided on embarking on the hazardous and terrible enterprise of war must at the outset present a one-sided case in justification of its action, and cannot afford to admit in any particular whatever the smallest degree of right or reason on the part of the people it has made up its mind to fight. Facts must be distorted, relevant circumstances concealed and a picture presented which by its crude colouring will persuade the ignorant people that their Government is blameless, their cause is righteous, and that the indisputable wickedness of the enemy has been proved beyond question. A moment's reflection would tell any reasonable person that such obvious bias cannot possibly represent the truth. But the moment's reflection is not allowed; lies are circulated with great rapidity. The unthinking mass accept them and by their excitement sway the rest. The amount of rubbish and humbug that pass under the name of patriotism in war-time in all countries is sufficient to make decent people blush when they are subsequently disillusioned.

== See also ==
- Charles C. Tansill
