= Randal Marlin =

Canadian academic (1938–2026)

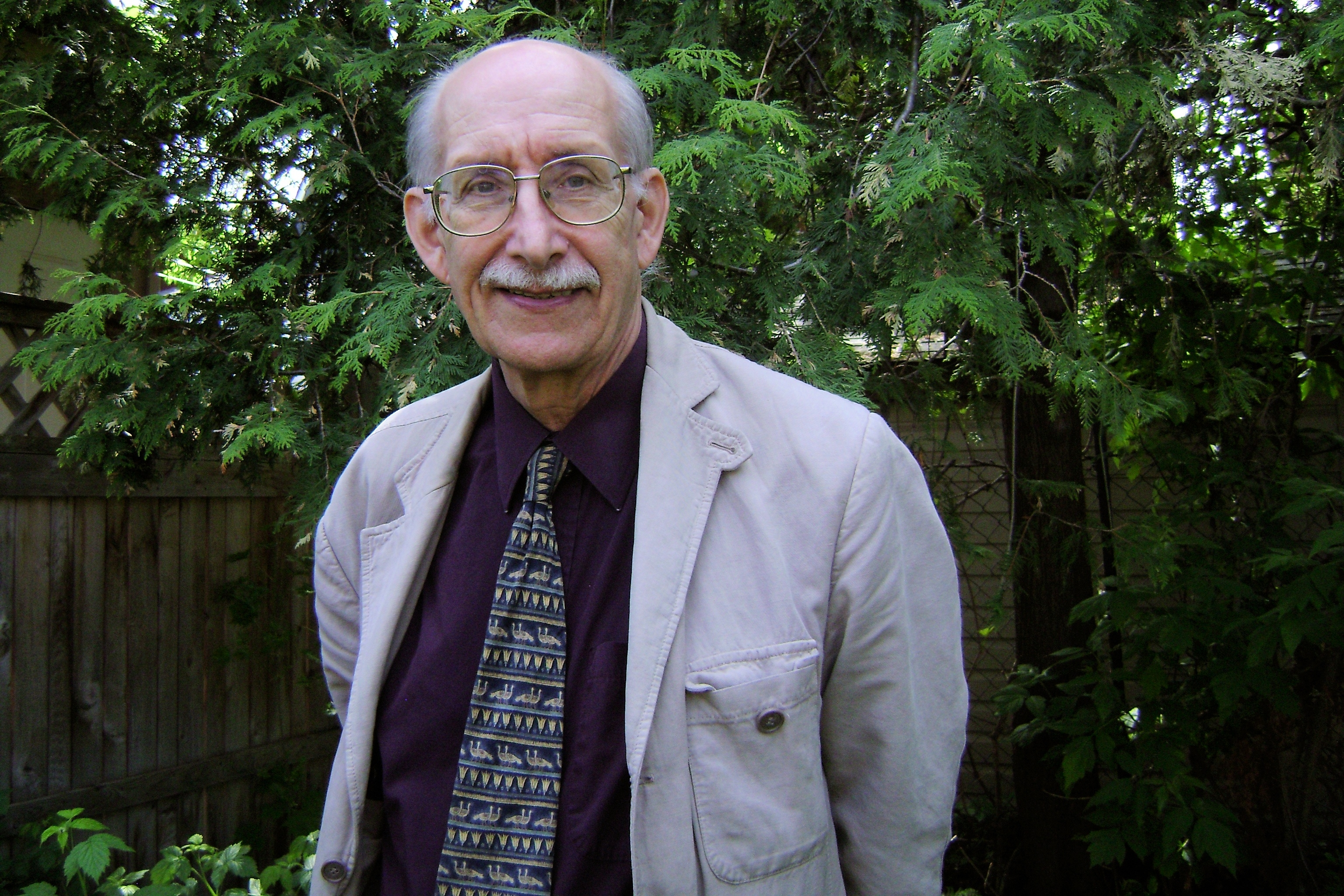
- Marlin in 2010
- Born: 22 January 1938; Washington D.C., U.S.
- Died: 15 May 2026 (aged 88); Ottawa, Ontario, Canada
- Occupations: Philosophy professor, Carleton University
- Known for: Propaganda and the Ethics of Persuasion

Randal Marlin (22 January 1938 – 15 May 2026) was a Canadian philosophy professor at Carleton University in Ottawa who specialized in the study of propaganda. He was educated at Princeton University, McGill University, the University of Oxford, Aix-Marseille University, and the University of Toronto. After receiving a Department of National Defence fellowship to study under propaganda scholar Jacques Ellul at Bordeaux in 1979–1980, he started a philosophy and mass communications class at Carleton called Truth and Propaganda, which has run annually ever since.

One of the texts for this class is his 2002 book Propaganda and the Ethics of Persuasion, which examines historical, ethical, and legal issues relating to propaganda. The revised second edition, released in 2013, examines the Bush administration's use of propaganda based on fear to persuade Americans to support the 2003 invasion of Iraq. Marlin acknowledges that there are many definitions of propaganda, including favourable ones. However, his book reflects Ellul's view that propaganda suppresses individual freedom and autonomy.

In 1998, Marlin published a book examining the public uproar following the appointment of a former separatist Quebec political candidate to the top administrator's post at the new Ottawa Hospital. The David Levine Affair: Separatist Betrayal or McCarthyism North? criticizes the Ottawa news media for fanning the flames of intolerance in their quest for higher circulations and audience ratings. The book also documents how the media kept the controversy going with a barrage of stories, columns, letters, editorials and radio phone-in shows. The David Levine Affair draws on Marlin's knowledge of propaganda techniques that play on stereotypes as well as pre-existing fears, suspicions and resentments to incite intense emotional reactions.

Marlin died on 15 May 2026, at the age of 88.

== Early life and education ==
Randal Marlin spent his early childhood in Washington D.C. where he was born in 1938. His father worked for the U.S. Office of Strategic Services, the forerunner to the Central Intelligence Agency. The family moved to Montreal in 1946 after his father started working for the United Nations. Marlin moved again to Ampleforth, a Benedictine college and boarding school, in England. "The school ran largely through the authority of the older boys over the younger boys," Marlin recalled during an interview in 2008. "You can see how people abuse power, and I got very interested in things about law."

In 1955, Marlin began four years of university studies at Princeton. He intended to pursue a career in physics, but discovered that he "couldn't really handle the math of nuclear physics in the second year." Fortunately, the university encouraged students to enroll in subjects outside their main fields and Marlin studied Greek philosophy. He also worked as a journalist at the student newspaper, the Daily Princetonian where he enjoyed stirring up controversy.

Marlin's interest in both philosophy and journalism led him to study the philosophy of language at McGill University. He wrote his thesis on Ernst Cassirer and the phenomenology of language earning an MA degree in philosophy in 1961. At Trinity College, Oxford he spent two years studying Edmund Husserl's phenomenology and the philosophy of existentialism. In 1963-64, Marlin taught and studied existentialism at the Institute for American Universities at Aix-en-Provence, France. Then in 1964, he began two years of teaching and PhD studies at the University of Toronto. His PhD thesis, completed in 1973, examined problems concerning morality and criminal law.

== Early professional career ==
In 1966, Randal Marlin accepted a teaching post at Carleton in Ottawa, partly because the university had a journalism school. By then, he had worked for two summers at the Montreal Star. He decided to institute a course called Society, Values and Technology to explore several interrelated themes. One reflected his growing involvement in preserving the older neighbourhood where he lived from being overwhelmed by heavy traffic. Marlin said that in the midst of that campaign, he realized from reading Aristotle's Rhetoric that a vivid example can be much more persuasive than logical arguments, an insight reinforced by a fellow community activist. "One thing I recall him saying," Marlin told an interviewer years later, "'If there's an accident in the area, exploit it. That's the time people will act to make changes in the traffic patterns. So don't miss the opportunity when something like that comes up.'"

Marlin's growing interest in persuasion took on added dimensions as he began reading The Technological Society by Jacques Ellul. The book argues that every field of human activity is now dominated by efficient technical methods or, what Ellul calls, technique. Marlin said Ellul's work showed him how the techniques of creating and managing public opinion feed off of or augment each other. Ellul had also published a landmark study of propaganda which explains how information can be used in the exercise of power. "That's the central idea of propaganda," Marlin says, "the maintaining or gaining of power over others."

== Truth and propaganda ==
Marlin's fascination with Ellul's writings gave him an idea. "During a crazy moment," he recalled, "I saw one of those advertisements for a Department of National Defence (DND) fellowship, offered for study abroad. It was $12,000, which, in those days -- 1979-1980, was a lot of money." Marlin told DND that Canadians needed to know more about the dangers of subversive propaganda and that if he were given a chance to study with Jacques Ellul at the University of Bordeaux in France, he would establish a university course on propaganda. To his surprise, he won the fellowship. "I had this great delight of studying for a year with Jacques Ellul. I found him as fascinating in person as he was in his writings." After his year abroad, Marlin returned to Carleton and created the course Truth and Propaganda.

== Propaganda and ethics ==
In 2002, Marlin published Propaganda and the Ethics of Persuasion, the book that now serves as one of the texts for his university course on propaganda. It contains extensive information about propaganda including various definitions, a brief history from ancient times to the 20th century and a discussion of propaganda techniques. Marlin bases his own definition of propaganda on what he sees as three of its main features. First, propaganda aims to influence many people in organized and deliberate ways. Second, it is likely to deceive its target audience and third, it uses psychological influences to suppress or bypass rational thought. Therefore, Marlin defines propaganda as:

The organized attempt through communication to affect belief or action or inculcate attitudes in a large audience in ways that circumvent or suppress an individual's adequately informed, rational, reflective judgment.

In his chapters on ethics, Marlin suggests that propaganda is always ethically questionable because it tries to manipulate using misleading information, emotional appeals and psychological pressure. He notes that although we tend to associate propaganda with political power or ideology, it also includes other forms of persuasion such as advertising and public relations.

== Atrocity propaganda ==
In Propaganda and the Ethics of Persuasion, Marlin notes that atrocity propaganda is used to demonize wartime enemies. He writes, for example, that during World War I, British propaganda accused German soldiers of publicly raping women in the town square, decapitating babies and forcing parents to watch as their children's hands and ears were cut off. The American public relations firm Hill & Knowlton resorted to atrocity propaganda during the 1990/91 Gulf War when it spread the story that the Iraqi soldiers who had invaded Kuwait were ripping helpless Kuwaiti babies from hospital incubators.

=== Corpse Factory story ===
In his textbook and in other writings, Marlin examines a specific example of World War I atrocity propaganda to illustrate propaganda techniques. The Corpse Factory story incited hatred and loathing of Germans who were supposedly "boiling their own dead soldiers to extract from their bodies lubricating oil, fats, soap, glue, glycerine for explosives, bonemeal for animal feed, and fertilizer." According to Marlin's research, the story was likely concocted by British and Belgian propagandists in London and then spread far and wide beginning on 17 April 1917 by the Times and the Daily Mail, newspapers owned by Lord Northcliffe, a man with close connections to British propaganda.

The Northcliffe papers gave the story credibility by combining a mistranslated report from a German newspaper about dead horses being boiled down for glue, with an invented story, ostensibly from Belgian newspapers, quoting a detailed, eyewitness description of dead German soldiers being dumped into a huge cauldron at a "Corpse Exploitation Establishment." Other news media spread the gruesome story worldwide.

=== Propaganda techniques ===
Marlin writes that the Corpse Factory story illustrates the seven requirements for effective propaganda outlined in the 1938 book Propaganda Boom by A. J. Mackenzie. Those requirements are:

- Repetition: The Northcliffe papers kept the story going day after day by publishing readers' letters.
- Colour: The eyewitness description of the corpse factory appealed to readers' imaginations.
- Kernel of truth: The Germans did have plants to boil down animal carcasses.
- Slogans: The story gave support to such propaganda slogans as "The Germans are ghouls."
- Specific objective: The story incited hatred of the Germans and encouraged people to join in the fight against them.
- Concealed motive: Publishing reports from "foreign" papers obscured the source of the propaganda.
- Timing: The mistranslated German report on the animal rendering plant coincided with the concocted Belgian corpse factory report.

According to Marlin and Joachim Neander, the Corpse Factory story also illustrates other propaganda techniques including the use of deceptive language, appeal to emotion and the Big Lie. They write that after the story was exposed as false in 1925, people were determined not to be fooled again. Thus, many doubted reports about the Holocaust early in World War II—testimony to the long-lasting and harmful effects of atrocity propaganda.

== Two propaganda theorists ==
Marlin makes it clear in Propaganda and the Ethics of Persuasion, that George Orwell and Jacques Ellul strongly influenced his own writing. He refers to both thinkers as major propaganda theorists "who sought to expose the forces at work integrating an individual into a larger system and frustrating an individual's self-development and freedom."

=== George Orwell ===
Marlin credits Orwell with effectively and passionately exposing the enslaving effects of propagandistic language. He points to Newspeak, the language Orwell invented in his satirical novel Nineteen Eighty-Four to illustrate how words could reinforce the totalitarian power of a police state by eradicating historical memory and narrowing the range of thought.

Marlin also refers to Orwell's famous 1946 essay Politics and the English Language which describes, for example, how a euphemism such as pacification served to cover up state violence and murder. "The extraordinary thing," Marlin notes, "is that exactly the same word for exactly the same kind of activity was used in the Vietnam War many years later."

Marlin writes that Orwell showed how the owners of weekly magazines used adventure stories and comics to transmit capitalist and imperialist values partly through the repeated use of class and national stereotypes. He observes that "the most effective propaganda is not recognized as such, and its message is often best presented obliquely."

=== Jacques Ellul ===
"There is probably no other thinker who has thought as deeply about propaganda in all its dimensions and ramifications as Jacques Ellul," Marlin writes. "What sets him apart from other analysts is his rare if not unique combination of expertise in history, sociology, law, and political science, along with careful study of biblical and Marxist writings." Marlin adds that for Ellul, propaganda is a technique that promotes acceptance of other techniques in a mass society where people are routinely victims of the illusion that technology will solve all our problems. Thus, propaganda is needed to adjust people to conditions imposed by technological development --- conditions that may require them to adapt to the increasingly inescapable requirements of the technological system. Elsewhere, Marlin has argued that the large and powerful vested interests that benefit from what he calls "the technological system" generate systematic propaganda glorifying technology. In a review of Ellul's book The Technological Bluff, Marlin comments on "the obscene way in which American television lavished praise on smart bombs" during the 1990-1991 Persian Gulf War "paying little attention to the human suffering they caused."

Marlin explains that for Ellul, propaganda is founded on the governing myths of a society. These include the myths of work, happiness, the nation, youth and the hero. Ellul sees such myths as "pre-propaganda" because they lay the groundwork for active propaganda campaigns. Marlin points out that Ellul's concept of "sociological propaganda" is similar in that it also provides the basis for more overt propaganda campaigns. He writes that the notion of an "American way of life", for example, provides a sociological backdrop for active propaganda. "Once one accepts the American way of life as superior, it becomes a criterion of good and evil; things that are un-American become evil," Marlin writes.

Aside from Ellul's work on propaganda and technology, Marlin has also written appreciatively about the French thinker's theological studies. His 1986 review of Ellul's Money and Power, for example, concludes that it contains "a wealth of insight" adding, "[a]s Roman Catholics we have much to learn, and relearn, from this book. Marlin notes Ellul's belief that money predisposes people to neglect their primary obligation toward God. "The real question," Marlin writes, "is whether wealth or the prospect of attaining it is the dominant force in our lives. Any time we subordinate human considerations to narrow economic exchange relationships --- ignoring the fact that cost-savings programmes cause widespread unemployment, for example --- we reveal a preoccupation with the wrong standpoint. Our heart is after the wrong treasure."

== David Levine affair ==
In 1998, Marlin published a book analyzing the uproar over the appointment of David Levine as administrator of The Ottawa Hospital, an amalgamation of the Ottawa General, founded by French-speaking Roman Catholic nuns, and the Ottawa Civic which, although officially non-denominational, was regarded as a Protestant, predominantly English-speaking institution. Levine, who was fluently bilingual, had 15 years experience running hospitals in Montreal. He had also served as president of the Canadian Association of Teaching Hospitals. However, in 1979, Levine had run unsuccessfully as a candidate for the separatist Parti Québécois in a Quebec provincial election and he had campaigned in favour of Quebec's sovereignty in the provincial referendum of 1980. At the time of his appointment to the $330,000 hospital administrator's job in Ottawa, Levine was working as the Parti Québécois government's representative in New York.

After the news of Levine's appointment broke on 1 May 1998, outraged readers wrote record numbers of letters to Ottawa newspapers and flooded radio phone-in shows with angry calls. Both of Ottawa's major newspapers, the Ottawa Citizen and the Ottawa Sun, published editorials and columns condemning Levine's appointment and calling on him to resign. On 19 May 1998, the "hurricane of protest" drew national attention when a boisterous crowd confronted the hospital's board of directors in an Ottawa auditorium expressing "unmitigated fury" and referring to Quebec separatists as "anti-Canadians, bastards." In the end, the hospital board refused to fire Levine and after about a month, the public anger subsided.

In his analysis of the affair, Marlin criticizes the Ottawa media for fanning the flames of protest in their competitive pursuit of higher circulations and audience ratings. He also argues that although Canadians tend to regard McCarthyism as a feature of U.S. political life, the Levine affair contained its basic ingredients -- "a strident patriotism, which reduced complex questions to a simple us-and-them mentality." He adds: "We are dealing not just with a local issue, but with a problem that is at the core of the Canadian unity debate. The Levine affair is a microcosm of suspicion, mistrust and misunderstanding that could someday be repeated on a larger scale with worse consequences."

About 200 people turned out in November 1998 when Marlin launched his book on the Levine affair at an Ottawa Chapters store. According to a report in the Ottawa Citizen, many heckled the author, objecting to his contention that Levine's political views were irrelevant to his work as a hospital administrator. The report added: "As some members of the crowd became more hostile, Mr. Marlin demanded to know if a heckler had read his book. When the man answered no, Mr. Marlin shouted back: 'It's typical of the prejudice I'm trying to fight.' The arguing continued for a lengthy time and then the heckler approached Mr. Marlin and whispered, 'I have two sons, and I'll never send them to Carleton because of people like you.'"

== Bibliography ==
- Marlin, Randal. (2002) Propaganda and the Ethics of Persuasion. Toronto: Broadview Press. ISBN 1-55111-376-7
- Marlin, Randal. (1998)The David Levine Affair: Separatist Betrayal or McCarthyism North? Winnipeg, Manitoba: Fernwood Publishing ISBN 978-1-55266-003-4
