= Svevo Moltrasio =

Italian director, actor and screenwriter

Svevo Moltrasio (born 19 December 1980) is an Italian director, actor and screenwriter.

== Life and career ==
Born in Rome, Svevo graduated in Cinema from the Roma Tre University with a thesis on Clint Eastwood, started writing as film critic for several university magazine and website before debuted as writer, actor and editor on Ieri, oggi e dopodomani (2002, short film).

In 2007 he directed his last I colpevoli, his last Italian short film then he moved to Paris where he shot Une famille in 2011, his only French shot film, before move away completely from his artistic life. Working in a call centre, Svevo met Federico Iarlori, an Italian expat that want be an actor, that pushed him to create a new story. This new project evolved in a comedic webseries on a couple of Italians that left their country for Paris and realize how the life abroad is still hard.

The success of Ritals (2015-2019) gave Svevo Moltrasio the possibility to write for La Repubblica and Le Figaro, a book of his own experience and moved back to Rome in 2019, debuting as DAM Cinema teacher, feature film director in 2023 with Gli Ospiti and then directed Smart Working in 2026.

== Filmography ==
=== Film ===
Year	Title	Character	Role(s)
2023	Gli ospiti	Diego	Producer, director, writer and editor
2025	Smart working	Stefano	Director, writer and editor

=== Short film ===
Year	Title	Character	Role(s)
2007	I colpevoli	No role	Director, writer and editor
2011	Une famille	Giuliano	Director, writer and editor
2020	Gli inetti	Svevo and clones	One man film

=== Web-series ===
Year	Title	Episodes	Character	Role(s)	Channel
2015-2019	Ritals	36+62 extras	Svevo	Director, writer and editor	Ritals la web-serie
2019-2020	Il rimpatriato	6+9 film review	Svevo	Director, writer and editor	Svevo Moltrasio
2022-2023	Come muore in Cinema in Italia	3+1 extra	Svevo	Director, writer and editor	Svevo Moltrasio

Commercials

Year	Title	Episodes	Sponsor
2016	Il francese, una lingua vicina per andare lontano	3	Institut Français
2016	La scommessa	3	Unibet
2020-2021	Ritals per AirFrance	4+1 extra	Air France

== Other works ==
- Parigi senza ritorno (2017, book)
- Svevo Caput Mundi (2021, podcast)

== Awards, honors and recognition ==
Ritals allowed Svevo Moltrasio, Federico Iarlori and Quentin Darmon to speak in a conference on Italo-French relationship in both the Sorbonne in Paris and the Sapienza University in Rome.

Gli Ospiti was selected in 8 festival including the Catania Film Festival 2023 and Sudestival 2024, where the composer Luca Gaigher won the Silver CD Award for the music.

Smart Working was shown as special event in Milan Film Festival 2026.
