= Dorothy Woodman =

British social activist and journalist

- Born: 1902; Swindon, England
- Died: September 1970 (aged 67–68)
- Education: University of Exeter
- Occupation: Journalist

Dorothy Woodman (1902 – September 1970) was a British socialist activist, communist and journalist.

== Biography ==
Woodman was born in Swindon, into a family known for its nonconformist religious beliefs and liberal politics. She was interested in Asia from an early age, and learned Sanskrit from a local poet. She studied at University College, Exeter, where she became a socialist. She worked for a short while as a schoolteacher, but soon left to become the secretary of the Women's International League. In 1928, she moved to become secretary of the Union of Democratic Control. Additionally, she was active in the Labour Party, for which she stood unsuccessfully in Aylesbury at the 1931 general election, and Wood Green in 1935.

In 1933, Woodman was working as a journalist in Berlin, and covered the Reichstag fire. Woodman falsely claimed to be in a relationship with the defendant Georgi Dimitrov in order to gain access to him, and was then able to transfer messages between him and his friends, and co-ordinate his defence. Dimitrov subsequently praised Woodman as largely responsible for his acquittal. She also reported from the meeting of British fascists at Olympia.

Woodman met Kingsley Martin in about 1935, while the two were living in Cambridge, and the two remained in an open relationship until Martin' death.

Woodman remained secretary of the Union of Democratic Control for many years, focusing on providing a voice to nationalist activists, particularly those from British colonies in Asia. In this role, she was closely watched by the Special Intelligence Service, who believed she might be a Soviet agent. She worked closely with Jomo Kenyatta when he was a student in London, and with Krishna Menon and his India League, and also organised the China Campaign Committee. She also worked as Asia correspondent for the New Statesman, and in 1962, wrote The Making of Burma, a book opposing colonialism.

Woodman died in 1970, with those paying tribute including Indira Gandhi. In her will, she left money to support an annual Kingsley Martin Memorial Lecture at the University of Cambridge.

Woodman was a vegetarian. In 1966, Louis Fischer described Woodman as a "Parliamentary Labor candidate, vegetarian, pacifist, and dynamic revolutionist."

Non-profit organization positions
Preceded by Stella Retinger	Secretary of the Union of Democratic Control; 1928–?	Succeeded by ?
