= The Basic Principles of War Propaganda =

2001 monograph by Anne Morelli

The Basic Principles of War Propaganda (Principes élémentaires de propagande de guerre) is a monograph by the Belgian historian Anne Morelli published in 2001. It has not been translated into English. The subtitle recommends its "usability in case of cold, hot or lukewarm war" (Utilisables en cas de guerre froide, chaude ou tiède).

The ten "commandments" of propaganda which Morelli elaborates in this work are, above all, an analytical framework for pedagogical purposes and for media analysis. Morelli does not want to take sides or defend "dictators", but show the regularity of use of the ten principles in the media and in society:

"I will not put to test the purity of one or the other's intentions. I am not going to find out who is lying and who is telling the truth, who is believing what he says, and who does not. My only intention is to illustrate the principles of propaganda that are used and to describe their functioning." (P. 6)

Nonetheless, it seems undeniable to the author that after the wars that characterized the twentieth century (WW1, WW2, Iraq, Yugoslavia), Western democracies and their media must be discussed.

As Rudolph Walther in his review in Die Zeit shows, Morelli in this work adapts the typical forms of various contents of propaganda to news of her time. She takes up Arthur Ponsonby's Falsehood in War-Time and George Demartial's La mobilisation des consciences. La guerre de 1914 about propaganda in WWI, systematizes them in the form of ten principles, and applies them to both world wars, the war in the Balkans, and the war in Iraq. Four of the following principles, according to Walther just emanate directly from the principle of friend or foe, "we and them" mindset and simplistic thinking in terms of black and white.

== Contents ==
=== 1. We don't want war, we are only defending ourselves! ===
According to Morelli, statesmen of all countries themselves have always solemnly assured that they do not want war. Wars are always undesired, only very rarely a war is seen positively by the population. With the emergence of democracy, the consent of the population becomes indispensable, so war must be rejected and everyone must be a pacifist at heart, unlike in the Middle Ages, when the opinion of the population was of little importance. "Thus, the French government mobilizes the army and announces at the same time that mobilization is not a war, but on the contrary the best way to secure peace." "If all the leaders are inspired by the same will to peace, one wonders why wars break out after all." The second principle provides an answer to this question.

=== 2. Our adversary is solely responsible for this war! ===
Morelli puts forward that this principle follows from the fact that each party assures to be compelled to declare war in order to prevent the adversary from "destroying our values", endangering our freedom, or destroying us altogether. It is the paradox of a war that is waged to prevent wars. This leads us almost to George Orwell's mythical phrase: "War is peace." In line with this understanding, the USA was forced to wage war against Iraq, because Iraq had left no other choice. They react only, defending themselves against provocations of the enemy, who is fully responsible for the outbreak of the war. "Daladier assures in his 'Call to the Nation' on September 3, 1939 - taking over the responsibility of France for the consequences of the Treaty of Versailles -:' Germany has already refused to respond to the people with a good heart at this time have raised their voice for peace in the world. [...] We wage the war because they force it on us. '"Ribbentrop justified the war against Poland by saying:" The Fuehrer does not want war. He resolves on this with a heavy heart. But the decision on war and peace does not depend on him. It depends on Poland. In certain vital questions for the Reich, Poland has to give in and fulfill the demands that we can not do without. If Poland refuses, the responsibility for a conflict lies with her and not with Germany. "(p. 16 in the French original) In the same sense, on January 9, 1991, we could read about the Gulf War in Le Soir: "The peace that the whole world desires more than anything else, can not be built on simple concessions to an act of piracy." The same is true of the Iraq war, because before the war broke out, on September 12, 2002 Le Parisien titled: How Saddam prepares for war.

=== 3. Our adversary's leader is inherently evil and resembles the devil ===
Morelli writes: "You can not hate a group of people altogether, not even as your enemies. It is therefore more effective to direct the hatred to the leading personality of the enemy country. This way, "the enemy" will have a face, and this face will naturally become the object of hatred."

She comments: "The victor will always portray himself as a pacifist who loves peaceful agreements and mutual understanding, but is forced into war by the opposing camp, as Bush or Blair did." "The enemy camp is most certainly run by a maniac, a monster (Milosevic, Bin Laden, Saddam Hussein), (...) which challenges us and from which one must free humanity."

The first step in the process of demonization, according to Morelli, is the reduction of a whole country to a single person, as if nobody lived in Iraq, except Saddam Hussein with his "scary" Republican guards and his "frightful" weapons of mass destruction.

Personalizing conflicts is typical of a particular view of history, according to which history is made by heroes, by "great people". Anne Morelli rejects this view of history and writes tirelessly about what official historiography conceals. The official account of history is idealistic and metaphysical in that it assumes that history is the result of great ideas and great people. She opposes this view with a dialectical and materialistic one, in which history is explained from the basis of the relations between people and from social movements.

The opponent is characterized by all conceivable ills and evils. They range from the physical appearance to sexual life. Thus, Le Vif in L'Express on April 8, 1999, depicts the "terrible Milosevic", she quotes no statement or written document of the "ruler of Belgrade", but highlights his abnormal mood swings, his morbid and brutal outbursts of anger: "When getting in rage, his face is distorted. But all of a sudden, he will regain his composure." Of course, this demonization is used for other purposes as well, as all tools of propaganda are. Pierre Bourdieu, for example, reports that in the US university teachers who disliked Michel Foucault's popularity in their high schools wrote books on Foucault's private life. According to them, this "masochistic and crazy homosexual" practiced "unnatural, scandalous and unacceptable sexual practices." By disqualifying Foucault as a person, they could spare themselves the more difficult confrontation with the author's thinking or with the discourses of a political person and "refute" him on the basis of moral judgments.

=== 4. We are defending a noble cause, not our particular interests! ===
Morelli analyzes that the economic and geopolitical goals of war must be masked by an ideal, by moral and legitimate values. Thus, George W. Bush declared, "There are people who will never understand this. The fight is not for oil, the fight is against brutal aggression". Le Monde wrote on January 22, 1991: "The goals of this war are first and foremost the goals of the UN Security Council. We participate in this war for the reasons behind the decisions of the Security Council and the goal essentially is the liberation of Kuwait." "In our modern societies, different from Louis XIV's time, a war can only be started with the consent of the people. Gramsci has shown to what extent the cultural supremacy and the consent to government decisions are necessary. This approval is easy to win if the people believe that their freedom, their lives and their honor depend on this war. "For example, the goals of the First World War can be summarized in three points:" - to destroy militarism, - defend the smaller states, - prepare the world for democracy. These very honorable goals have since been repeated almost literally on the eve of each conflict, even though they do not fit the true purpose." "It is necessary to persuade public opinion that we, unlike our enemies, go to war for infinitely honorable motives." "For the Yugoslav war, we find the same deviation of the official goals from the unacknowledged goals of the conflict." NATO officially intervenes in order to preserve the multi-ethnic nature of Kosovo and in order to prevent minorities from being abused, in order to establish democracy and thus in order to end the rule of a dictator. It is in the defense of the sacred concerns of human rights. But not only at the end of this war you can see that none of these goals have been achieved, you have moved remarkably far away from a multi - ethnic society and from violence against minorities, this time Serbs and Roma. This violence is part of everyday life, but you realize that the economic and geopolitical goals have been achieved that have never been never spoken of."

Morelli adds: "The principle has a complement: that the enemy is a bloodthirsty monster representing a barbaric society."

=== 5. The enemy is purposefully committing atrocities; if we are making mistakes this happens without intention ===
Morelli maintains that the stories about the atrocities of the enemy are an essential element of propaganda. Cruelties are part of all wars. But insisting on the view that only the enemy has committed atrocities and that the "humanitarian" army was loved by the population makes stories of atrocities part of the propaganda. Moreover, Morelli goes on, war propaganda is not content with the actual incidents, it needs to invent inhuman atrocities in order to make the enemy look like Hitler's alter ego.

She sees hardly any differences in the way atrocities are described in different wars. For the period of the First World War, Ponsonby portrays the rendering of gang rape, murder, mistreatment and mutilation of children by German soldiers. Morelli shows how similar reports from wars in Iraq and Kosovo are.

=== 6. The enemy makes use of illegal weapons ===
Morelli views this principle as a complement to the previous one. "We do not commit atrocities but, on the contrary, we are going to war chivalrously, following the rules, as in a contest, of course, they are tough and masculine rules." There were furious protests in the First World War against the use of poison gas. Each warring party accused the other of having started it. Although both used gas as a weapon and had been doing research in this field, it was the symbolic expression of inhumane warfare. Therefore, Morelli concludes, it was attributed to the enemy as an indecent and deceitful weapon.

=== 7. We suffer few losses, the enemy's losses are considerable ===
Morelli explains this principle or commandment as follows: "With rare exceptions, people tend to join the victorious cause. In the case of war, the preference of public opinion depends very much on the apparent results of the conflict. If the results are not good, the propaganda must disguise our losses and exaggerate those of the enemy."

She cites the fact that already in the First World War the losses accumulated within the first month and rose to 313,000 casualties. But the Supreme Command never even reported the loss of a horse and did not publish a list of the dead.

Morelli sees the Iraq war as another example of the prohibiting the publication of photographs of the coffins of American soldiers. The losses of the enemy, however, were gigantic, their army offered no resistance. "This type of information enhances morale in both camps and makes public opinion convinced of the effectiveness of the conflict."

=== 8. Recognized intellectuals and artists support our cause ===
Morelli states that since the First World War, intellectuals have mostly massively supported their own camp. Each war party could count on the support of artists, writers and musicians who supported the concerns of their countries through initiatives in their fields of activity.

She refers to caricaturists that she thinks are used to justify the war and depict the "butcher" and his atrocities, while others with their camera in hand, produce heart-moving documents about Albanian refugees, carefully selecting those that are most similar to the audience, such as the pretty blonde Albanian child with homesickness in the eye, who should remind us of the Albanian victims.

Everywhere, Morelli writes, "manifests" are published. The Manifesto of the Hundred, aiming at supporting France in the First World War, was signed by André Gide, Claude Monet, Claude Debussy and Paul Claudel. Closer to the present is the Manifesto of the 12 against the "new totalitarianism" of Islamism. These groups of intellectuals, artists and distinguished personalities justify the actions of their respective state power.

=== 9. Our cause is sacred ===
This criterion is understood by Morelli in two different ways: in the literal sense, war presents itself as a crusade, backed by a divine mission. One must not escape the will of God, one must fulfill it. This view has gained new importance since George W. Bush took office, Morelli states. The Iraq war appears in this view as a crusade against the "axis of evil", as the "fight of good against evil". It is seen as a duty to bring democracy to Iraq, a value that sprang directly from the will of God. Warfare was thus the realization of the divine will. Political decisions take on a biblical character that eliminates all social and economic issues. The reference to God is made in many ways (In God We Trust, God Save the Queen, Gott mit uns [God with us], ...) and serves to justify the actions of the sovereign without any chance of contradiction.

=== 10. Whoever casts doubt on our propaganda helps the enemy and is a traitor ===
This last principle complements all others, Morelli explains. Whoever questions only one of the principles is necessarily a collaborator. There are only two areas, good and bad. You can only be for or against evil. The opponents of the Kosovo war are thus accomplices of Milošević. Whole groups are considered anti-American, Pierre Bourdieu, Régis Debray, Serge Halimi, Noam Chomsky or Harold Pinter. The "pacifist family" includes Gisèle Halimi, Renaud, Abbé Pierre... and their press organs, i.e. Le Monde Diplomatique and the PCF.

Therefore, Morelli says, it is made impossible to give a dissenting opinion without running the risk of a "lynching process of the media". The normal pluralism of opinions no longer exists, all opposition is silenced and discredited by fake arguments.

According to Morelli, this procedure was applied again in the Iraq war, although the world public was far more divided than in the Kosovo conflict. Being against the war meant advocating for Saddam Hussein. The same design was used in a completely different context, namely during the vote on the European Constitution. To be against the Constitution was seen to mean to be against Europe.

== Reviews and reception ==
The German journalist Walther praised Morelli's theoretical framework: In his opinion, her publication works as an "intellectual instrument" for any newspaper reader or television viewer in order to "examine and criticize propaganda enforced by modern media". With much evidence from all major conflicts since the First World War, Morelli has examined the mechanisms of the warring parties, with which they manage to present their point of view as a just cause. Morelli, has succinctly summarized the basics of Ponsonby and Demartial.

Jochen Stöckmann was more critical of Morelli's investigation. He found it startling "that Morelli does not describe how the gears of media interlock, she does not research into the mechanisms and details, but argues exclusively with quotes, basing her criticism on the products of propaganda themselves. This type of superficial criticism of the media has long since become an integral part of the infotainment machinery, Stöckman maintains. To those who are so "enlightened", but actually rather hardened to criticism, each war reporting must appear as propaganda as long as it is not based on a pacifist attitude. Morelli should have cleared up the confusing situation, Stockmann insists, instead of just recommending 'systematic doubt' as an 'antidote'. But its effectiveness is likely to be exhausted quickly, as the historian sees almost every piece of news contaminated by the poisonous products of the right way of thinking which are poured out by media every day.

In his review in H-Soz-Kult on June 29, 2005, Lars Klein from the University of Göttingen writes after praising the relevance of the topic and the usefulness of her analysis, Morelli lacks clarification of whether "the media" themselves are acting independently, whether they follow political or commercial interests and if they consciously or only unreflectingly abuse the "good faith" of the citizens. "Precisely because she uses the entire tenth chapter [...] to show how important media stick to their 'own side', further and clearer explanations would have been desirable."
