= Ritals =

Web-series (2015-2018)

- Also known as: Ritals la web-serie
- Genre: Comedy; Drama
- Created by: Svevo Moltrasio
- Starring: Svevo Moltrasio; Federico Iarlori; Quentin Darmon
- Composer: Luca Gaigher
- Countries of origin: Italy, France
- Original languages: Italian, French
- No. of seasons: 4
- No. of episodes: 36 + 62 Extras

Production
- Cinematography: Cristian Zanin

Original release
- Network: YouTube
- Release: 1 July 2015 – 23 July 2018

Ritals (also known as Ritals la web-serie) is an Italo-French web series created by Svevo Moltrasio as an ironic tale of the life of two Italians expatriated in Paris, aired between July 2015 and July 2018. The quality of the Sitcom was so impressive that the show-runner and creator debuted as feature film director in 2023 (Gli Ospiti, self-produced) and 2026 with Smart Working. The success of series among Italians and French allowed the cast to participate in conferences in both the Sorbonne and Sapienza and the launch of a sequel-series knows as Il Rimpatriato.

== Production ==
In 2009, Svevo Moltrasio left Rome after a brief career as short film director and he moved to Paris working in a Call centre where he met Federico Iarlori, an Italian expat who want be an actor. After a failing attempt of a short film, they developed a comedy inspired to their own life to show to Italians that want left the country how the life abroad is still hard. The series alternated Italian and French languages based on the interaction of the characters as Svevo Moltrasio already did in his first film in Paris in 2011.

=== Ritals Extra ===
The 18th episode of the first season was filmmed with a 2-minute comparison between the historic center of Rome and Paris but the scene was deleted from the final cut and posted as the first Extra of the channel. From 2016 Extras alternated with the Sitcom episode with 18 videos during the second season and 16 in the third one. The main format of the extras was the Comparison videos between Italy and France.

=== Fourth season ===
The last season of Ritals was one episode. Federico returned in Paris after he spent one year in his hometown Ortona in Abruzzo to complete his novel. Federico was not able to catch Svevo who already moved to Rome but he meet his support group for Italian expats where he admitted that Svevo was right of Paris and he left the country again. The season continued with 26 extra videos where the Svevo director tried to produce the second episode of the 4th season failing a couple of times before he chose to not continued the series with Federico that tried in every way to publish videos on the channel, even without Svevo support. Ritals Extra became the serie with a Metacinemaseason that had even its own final, aired on 17 June 2019.

== Series overview ==
| Season | Episodes | Extras | Originally released | | Episodes views (millions) |
| Season | Episodes | Extras | First released | Last released | Episodes views (millions) |
|---|---|---|---|---|---|
| 1 | 19 | 6 | July 15, 2015 | July 28, 2016 | 5.6 |
| 2 | 9 | 13 | September 12, 2016 | July 17, 2017 | 2.6 |
| 3 | 7 | 17 | September 14, 2017 | July 18, 2018 | 1.2 |
| 4 | 1 | 26 | July 23, 2018 | June 17, 2019 | 0.1 |

== See also ==
- Smart working (film)
- Rital literature
- Italian diaspora
- Rital
