= Union of Democratic Control =

20th century British non-interventionist pressure group

The Union of Democratic Control (UDC) was a British pressure group formed in 1914 to press for a more responsive foreign policy. While not a pacifist organisation, it was opposed to military influence in government.

== World War I ==
The impetus for the formation of the UDC was the outbreak of the First World War, which its founders saw as having resulted from largely secret international understandings which were not subject to democratic overview. The principal founders were Charles P. Trevelyan, a Liberal government minister who had resigned his post in opposition to the declaration of war, and Ramsay MacDonald who resigned as Chairman of the Labour Party when it supported the government's war budget. Also taking a key role in setting up the Union were politician Arthur Ponsonby, author Norman Angell and journalist E. D. Morel. Following an initial letter circulated on 4 September 1914, an inaugural meeting was organised for 17 November. While non-partisan, the UDC was dominated by the left wing of the Liberal and Labour Parties.

== List of early supporters ==
=== Liberal Party ===
- Charles Trevelyan MP
- Philip Morrell MP
- Arnold Rowntree MP
- Arthur Ponsonby MP
- Richard Denman MP
- Hastings Lees-Smith MP
- R. L. Outhwaite MP
- Joseph King MP
- E.T. John MP
- Charles Buxton
- Morgan Philips Price
- E. D. Morel
- Norman Angell
- C. P. Scott
- Graham Wallas
- J. A. Hobson
- Ottoline Morrell
- George Cadbury
- Konni Zilliacus
- Bertrand Russell
- Sophia Sturge

=== Labour Party ===
- James Ramsay MacDonald MP
- Frederick William Jowett MP
- Philip Snowden MP
- William Crawford Anderson MP
- Frederick Pethick-Lawrence
- Tom Johnston
- David Kirkwood
- Helena Swanwick
- Isabella Ford
- H. N. Brailsford
- R. H. Tawney
- Mary Agnes Hamilton
- Margaret Bondfield

The Union did not call for an immediate end to the war but for a full examination of the war aims in public and by Parliament. It did strongly oppose conscription and wartime censorship along with other restrictions on civil liberties. As a result of this, the UDC was denounced by right-wingers such as The Morning Post newspaper as undermining the British war effort. The Religious Society of Friends (Quakers) provided general backing and most of the funds for the Union came from wealthy Quakers. There were also close links between the Union and the supporters of women's suffrage.

By 1917 the UDC had more than a hundred local branches across Britain and Ireland, and 10,000 individual members; it also had affiliations from organisations which represented 650,000 more. It became increasingly influential in the Labour Party, to which its members increasingly graduated due to the continued support for the war from the Liberals. The UDC criticised the Versailles Treaty as being unjust to Germany, and also advocated the withdrawal of Allied troops from Russia. A. J. P. Taylor said the UDC was "the most formidable Radical body ever to influence British foreign policy".

== Subsequent activity ==
At the end of the war, no thought was given to disbanding the Union and it continued to be active through the 1920s. In the first Labour government in 1924, fifteen Government ministers were members of the UDC.

As time went on, the UDC became more supportive of outright pacifism and Arthur Ponsonby published his pacifist statement Now is the Time in 1925 under UDC sponsorship. Ponsonby also started a petition of those who "refuse to support or render war service to any government which resorts to arms", and in 1928 published Falsehood in War-Time which claimed that public opinion was invariably peaceful unless roused by propaganda.

In the 1930s the UDC was led by Dorothy Woodman who reshaped it as an anti-fascist research and propaganda campaigning group. Membership was on a steep decline by this point. While the Union continued to exist in some form until the 1960s – Harold Wilson was briefly a UDC member in the 1950s – it had very little influence. It finally dissolved in 1966.

== Secretaries ==
1914: E. D. Morel
1925: Stella Retinger
1928: Dorothy Woodman

== See also ==
- Antimilitarism
- Anti-war movement
- Opposition to World War I
