= German Corpse Factory =

Atrocity propaganda story in World War I

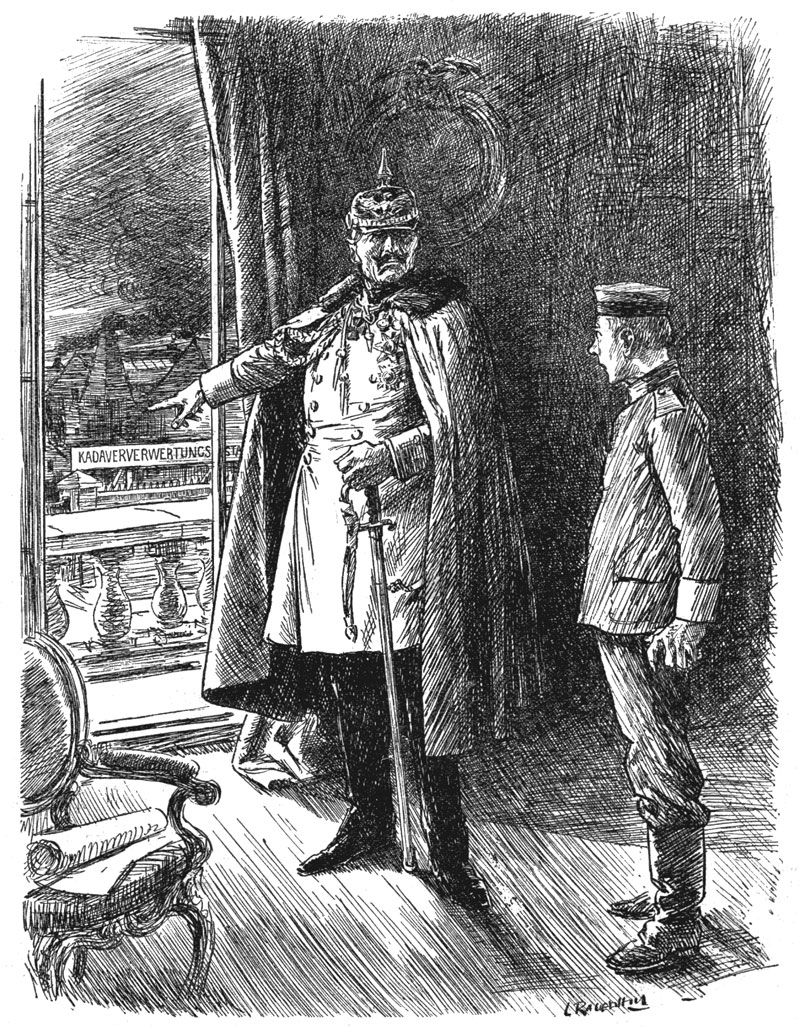
Wilhelm II to a recruit. "And don't forget that your Kaiser will find a use for you—alive or dead." Punch, 25 April 1917

The German Corpse Factory or Kadaververwertungsanstalt (literally "Carcass-Utilization Factory"), also sometimes called the "German Corpse-Rendering Works" or "Tallow Factory" was a recurring work of atrocity propaganda among the Allies of World War I, describing the German Empire's supposed use of human corpses in fat rendering during World War I. In the postwar years, investigations in Britain and France revealed that these stories were false.

According to a typical version of the story, the Kadaververwertungsanstalt was a special installation operated by the Germans in which, due to a scarcity of fat products amid the allied blockade, German battlefield corpses were rendered down for fat, which was then used to manufacture nitroglycerine, candles, lubricants, and even boot dubbin. It was supposedly operated behind the front lines by the DAVG — Deutsche Abfall-Verwertungs Gesellschaft ("German Waste Utilization Company").

Historian Piers Brendon has called it "the most appalling atrocity story" of World War I, while journalist Phillip Knightley has called it "the most popular atrocity story of the war." After the war, John Charteris, the former Chief of Intelligence at the British Expeditionary Force, allegedly stated in a speech that he had invented the story for propaganda purposes, with the principal aim of getting the Chinese to join the war against Germany.

Recent scholars do not credit the claim that Charteris created the story. Propaganda historian Randal Marlin says "the real source for the story is to be found in the pages of the Northcliffe press", referring to newspapers owned by Lord Northcliffe. Adrian Gregory presumes that the story originated from rumours that had been circulating for years, and that it was not "invented" by any individual: "The corpse-rendering factory was not the invention of a diabolical propagandist; it was a popular folktale, an 'urban myth', which had been circulated for months before it received any official notice."

== History ==
=== Rumours and cartoons ===
Rumours that the Germans used the bodies of their soldiers to create fat appear to have been circulating by 1915. Cynthia Asquith noted in her diary on 16 June 1915: “We discussed the rumour that the Germans utilise even their corpses by converting them into glycerine with the by-product of soap.” Such stories also appeared in the American press in 1915 and 1916. The French press also took it up in Le Gaulois, in February, 1916. In 1916 a book of cartoons by Louis Raemaekers was published. One depicted bodies of German soldiers being loaded onto a cart in neatly packaged batches. This was accompanied with a comment written by Horace Vachell: “I am told by an eminent chemist that six pounds of glycerine can be extracted from the corpse of a fairly well nourished Hun... These unfortunates, when alive, were driven ruthlessly to inevitable slaughter. They are sent as ruthlessly to the blast furnaces. One million dead men are resolved into six million pounds of glycerine." A later cartoon by Bruce Bairnsfather also referred to the rumour, depicting a German munitions worker looking at a can of glycerine and saying "Alas! My poor Brother!" (parodying a well-known advertisement for Bovril).

By 1917 the British and their allies were hoping to bring China into the war against Germany. On 26 February 1917 the English-language North-China Daily News published a story that the Chinese President Feng Guozhang had been horrified by Admiral Paul von Hintze's attempts to impress him when the "Admiral triumphantly stated that they were extracting glycerine out of dead soldiers!". The story was picked up by other papers.

In all these cases the story was told as rumour, or as something heard from people supposed to be 'in the know'. It was not presented as documented fact.

=== The Corpse factory ===
The first English language account of a real and locatable Kadaververwertungsanstalt appeared in the 16 April 1917 issue of The Times of London. In a short piece at the foot of its "Through German Eyes" review of the German press, it quoted from a recent issue of the German newspaper Berliner Lokal-Anzeiger a very brief story by reporter Karl Rosner of only 59 words in length, which described the bad smell coming from a "Kadaver" rendering factory, making no reference to the corpses being human. The following day, 17 April 1917, the story was repeated more prominently in editions of The Times and Daily Mail (both owned by Lord Northcliffe at the time), The Times running it under the title Germans and their Dead, in the context of a 500-plus word story which the editorial introduction stated came from the 10 April edition of the Belgian newspaper l'Indépendance Belge published in England, which in turn had received it from La Belgique, another Belgian newspaper published in Leiden, The Netherlands. The Belgian account stated specifically that the bodies were those of soldiers and interpreted the word "kadaver" as a reference to human corpses.

The story described how corpses arrived by rail at the factory, which was placed "deep in forest country" and surrounded by an electrified fence, and how they were rendered for their fats which were then further processed into stearin (a form of tallow). It went on to claim that this was then used to make soap, or refined into an oil "of yellowish brown colour". The supposedly incriminating passage in the original German article was translated in the following words:

We pass through Evergnicourt. There is a dull smell in the air, as if lime were being burnt. We are passing the great Corpse Utilization Establishment (Kadaververwertungsanstalt) of this Army Group. The fat that is won here is turned into lubricating oils, and everything else is ground down in the bones mill into a powder, which is used for mixing with pigs' food and as manure.

A debate followed in the pages of The Times and other papers. The Times stated that it had received a number of letters "questioning the translation of the German word Kadaver, and suggesting that it is not used of human bodies. As to this, the best authorities are agreed that it is also used of the bodies of animals." Letters were also received confirming the story from Belgian and Dutch sources and later from Romania.

The New York Times reported on 20 April that the article was being credited by all the French newspapers with the exception of the Paris-Midi, which preferred to believe that the corpses in question were those of animals rather than humans. The New York Times itself did not credit the story, pointing out that it appeared in early April and that German newspapers traditionally indulged in April Fools' Day pranks, and also that the expression "Kadaver" was not employed in current German usage to mean a human corpse, the word "Leichnam" being used instead. The only exception was corpses used for dissection—cadavers.

On 25 April the weekly British humorous magazine Punch printed a cartoon entitled "Cannon-Fodder—and After," which showed the Kaiser and a German recruit. Pointing out of a window at a factory with smoking chimneys and the sign "Kadaververwertungs[anstalt]," the Kaiser tells the young man: "And don't forget that your Kaiser will find a use for you—alive or dead."

On 30 April the story was raised in the House of Commons, and the government declined to endorse it. Lord Robert Cecil declared that he had no information beyond newspaper reports. He added that, "in view of other actions by German military authorities, there is nothing incredible in the present charge against them." However, the government, he said, had neither the responsibility nor the resources to investigate the allegations. In the months that followed, the account of the Kadaververwertungsanstalt circulated worldwide, but never expanded beyond the account printed in The Times; no eyewitnesses ever appeared, and the story was never enlarged or amplified.

Some individuals within the government nonetheless hoped to exploit the story, and Charles Masterman, director of the War Propaganda Bureau at Wellington House, was asked to prepare a short pamphlet. This was never published, however. Masterman and his mentor, Prime Minister David Lloyd George, never took the story seriously. An undated anonymous pamphlet entitled A 'corpse-conversion' Factory: A Peep Behind the German Lines was published by Darling & Son, probably around this time in 1917.

A month later, The Times revived the rumour by publishing a captured German Army order that made reference to a Kadaver factory. It was issued by the VsdOK, which The Times interpreted as Verordnungs-Stelle ("instructions department"). The Frankfurter Zeitung, however, insisted that it stood for Veterinar-Station (veterinary station). The Foreign Office agreed that order could only be referring to "the carcasses of horses."

Paul Fussell has also suggested that this may have been a deliberate British mistranslation of the phrase Kadaver Anstalt on a captured German order that all available animal remains be sent to an installation to be reduced to tallow.

== Postwar claims ==
=== Charteris' speech ===
On 20 October 1925, The New York Times reported on a speech given by Brigadier General John Charteris at the National Arts Club the previous evening. Charteris was then a Conservative MP for Glasgow, but had served as Chief of Army Intelligence for part of the war. According to the Times, the brigadier told his audience that he had invented the cadaver-factory story as a way of turning the Chinese against the Germans, and he had transposed the captions of two photographs that came into his possession, one showing dead soldiers being removed by train for funerals, the second showing a train car bearing horses to be processed for fertiliser. A subordinate had suggested forging a diary of a German soldier to verify the accusation, but Charteris vetoed the idea.

On his return to the UK, Charteris unequivocally denied the New York Times' report in a statement to The Times, saying that he was only repeating speculation that had already been published in the 1924 book These Eventful Years: The Twentieth Century In The Making. This referred to an essay by Bertrand Russell, in which Russell asserted that,

Any fact which had a propaganda value was seized upon, not always with strict regard for truth. For example, worldwide publicity was given to the statement that the Germans boiled down human corpses in order to extract from them gelatine and other useful substances. This story was widely used in China when that country's participation was desired, because it was hoped that it would shock the well-known Chinese reverence for the dead... The story was set going cynically by one of the employees in the British propaganda department, a man with a good knowledge of German, perfectly well aware that "Kadaver" means "carcase," not "corpse,"...

Charteris stated that he had merely repeated Russell's speculations, adding the extra information about the proposed fake diary:

Certain suggestions and speculations as regards the origins of the Kadaver story, which have already been published in These Eventful Years (British Encyclopedia Press) and elsewhere, which I repeated, are, doubtless unintentionally, but nevertheless unfortunately, turned into definite statements of fact and attributed to me. Lest there should still be any doubt, let me say that I neither invented the Kadaver story nor did I alter the captions in any photographs, nor did I use faked material for propaganda purposes. The allegations that I did so are not only incorrect but absurd, as propaganda was in no way under G.H.Q. France, where I had charge of the Intelligence Services. I should be as interested as the general public to know what was the true origin of the Kadaver story. G.H.Q. France only came in when a fictitious diary supporting the Kadaver story was submitted. When this diary was discovered to be fictitious, it was at once rejected.

The question was once again raised in Parliament, and Sir Laming Worthington-Evans said that the story that the Germans had set up a factory for the conversion of dead bodies first appeared on 10 April 1917, in the Berliner Lokal-Anzeiger, and in the Belgian newspapers l'Independance Belge and La Belgique.

Sir Austen Chamberlain finally established that the British government accepted that the story was untrue, when in a reply in Parliament on 2 December 1925 he said that the German Chancellor had authorised him to say on the authority of the German government, that there was never any foundation for the story, and that he accepted the denial on behalf of His Majesty's Government.

=== Interwar and World War II ===
The claim that Charteris invented the story to sway the opinion of the Chinese against the Germans was given wide circulation in Lord Arthur Ponsonby's highly influential book, Falsehood in War-Time, which examined, according to its subtitle, an "Assortment of Lies Circulated Throughout the Nations During the Great War". In his 1931 book Spreading Germs of Hate, pro-Nazi writer George Sylvester Viereck also insisted that Charteris had originated the story:

The explanation was vouchsafed by General Charteris himself in 1926 [sic], at a dinner at the National Arts Club, New York City. It met with diplomatic denial later on, but is generally accepted.

Charteris's alleged 1925 comments later gave Adolf Hitler rhetorical ammunition to portray the British as liars who would invent imaginary war crimes. The widespread belief that the Kadaververwertungsanstalt had been invented as propaganda had an adverse effect during World War II on rumours emerging about the Holocaust. One of the earliest reports in September 1942, known as the "Sternbuch cable" stated that the Germans were "bestially murdering about one hundred thousand Jews" in Warsaw and that "from the corpses of the murdered, soap and artificial fertilizers are produced". Victor Cavendish-Bentinck, chairman of the British Joint Intelligence Committee, noted that these reports were rather too similar to "stories of employment of human corpses during the last war for the manufacture of fat which was a grotesque lie." Likewise, The Christian Century commented that "The parallel between this story and the ‘corpse factory’ atrocity tale of the First World War is too striking to be overlooked.” German scholar Joachim Neander notes that "There can be no doubt that the reported commercial use of the corpses of the murdered Jews undermined the credibility of the news coming from Poland and delayed action that might have rescued many Jewish lives."

== Recent scholarship ==
Modern scholarship supports the view that the story arose from rumours circulating among troops and civilians in Belgium, and was not an invention of the British propaganda machine. It moved from rumour to apparent "fact" after the report in the Berliner Lokal-Anzeiger appeared about a real cadaver-processing factory. The ambiguous wording of the report allowed Belgian and British newspapers to interpret it as proof of the rumours that human corpses were used. Phillip Knightley says that Charteris may have concocted the claim that he invented the story in order to impress his audience, not realising a reporter was present. Randal Marlin says that Charteris's claim to have invented the story is "demonstrably false" in a number of details. However, it is possible that a fake diary was created but never used. Nevertheless, this diary, which Charteris claimed to still exist “in the war museum in London”, has never been found. It is also possible that Charteris suggested that the story would be useful propaganda in China, and that he created a miscaptioned photograph to be sent to the Chinese, but again there is no evidence of this.

Adrian Gregory is highly critical of Lord Ponsonby's account in Falsehood in War-Time, arguing that the story, like many other anti-German atrocity tales, originated with ordinary soldiers and members of the public: “the process was bottom-up more than top-down,” and that in most of the false atrocity stories “the public were misleading the press”, rather than a sinister press propaganda machine deceiving an innocent public. Joachim Neander says that the process was more like a "feedback loop" in which plausible stories were picked up and used by propagandists such as Charteris: "Charteris and his office most probably did not have a part in creating the 'Corpse factory' story. It can, however, be safely assumed that they were actively involved in its spreading." Furthermore, the story would have remained little more than rumour and tittle-tattle if it had not been taken up by respectable newspapers such as The Times in 1917.

Israeli writer Shimon Rubinstein suggested in 1987 that it was possible that the story of the corpse factory was true, but that Charteris wished to discredit it in order to foster harmonious relations with post-war Germany after the 1925 Treaty of Locarno. Rubinstein posited that such factories were “possible pilot-plants for the extermination centers the Nazis built during World War II.” Joachim Neander has commented that the absence of any reliable evidence that the “Corpse factory” establishments actually existed, completely undermines Rubinstein’s claims.

== See also ==
- Anti-German sentiment
- Soap made from human corpses
- Lampshades made from human skin
