= Nicole Malinconi =

Belgian writer (born 1946)

Nicole Malinconi (born 1946) is a Belgian writer.

The daughter of Omero Malinconi, a native of Italy, and a Belgian mother, she was born in Dinant and grew up in Italy and Belgium, learning both French and Italian. Malinconi was a social worker in a maternity clinic in Namur. She worked with doctor Willy Peers, who was trying to gain women the right to choose abortion. In 1978, she adopted two Korean children with Albert Mabille. She met the psychiatrist Jean-Pierre Lebrun in 1984, who introduced her to the works of authors Marguerite Duras, Nathalie Sarraute and Gustave Flaubert, also encouraging her to write.

In 1984, she released the novel Hôpital silence, which received favourable comments from Duras. In 1993, Malinconi published Nous deux, which won the Prix Victor-Rossel. Extracts from her work were adapted for the stage by comedian Nicole Colchat as Elles which was presented in Namur in 1996. Other works by Malinconi include:

- Da solo (novel) (1997)
- Rien ou presque (short stories) (1997)
- Jardin public (short stories) (2001)
- À l'étranger (novel) (2004)
- Les oiseaux de Messiaen (2005)
- Au bureau (novel) (2007)
- Vous vous appelez Michelle Martin (2007), from an interview with Michelle Martin, the wife of Marc Dutroux
