= Italian dialects =

Italian dialects may refer to:

- Regional Italian, any regional variety of the Italian language
- Languages of Italy, any language spoken in Italy, regardless of origin
- Italo-Dalmatian languages, languages that are related to Italian but do not stem from it
