= Anne Morelli =

Italian-Belgian historian

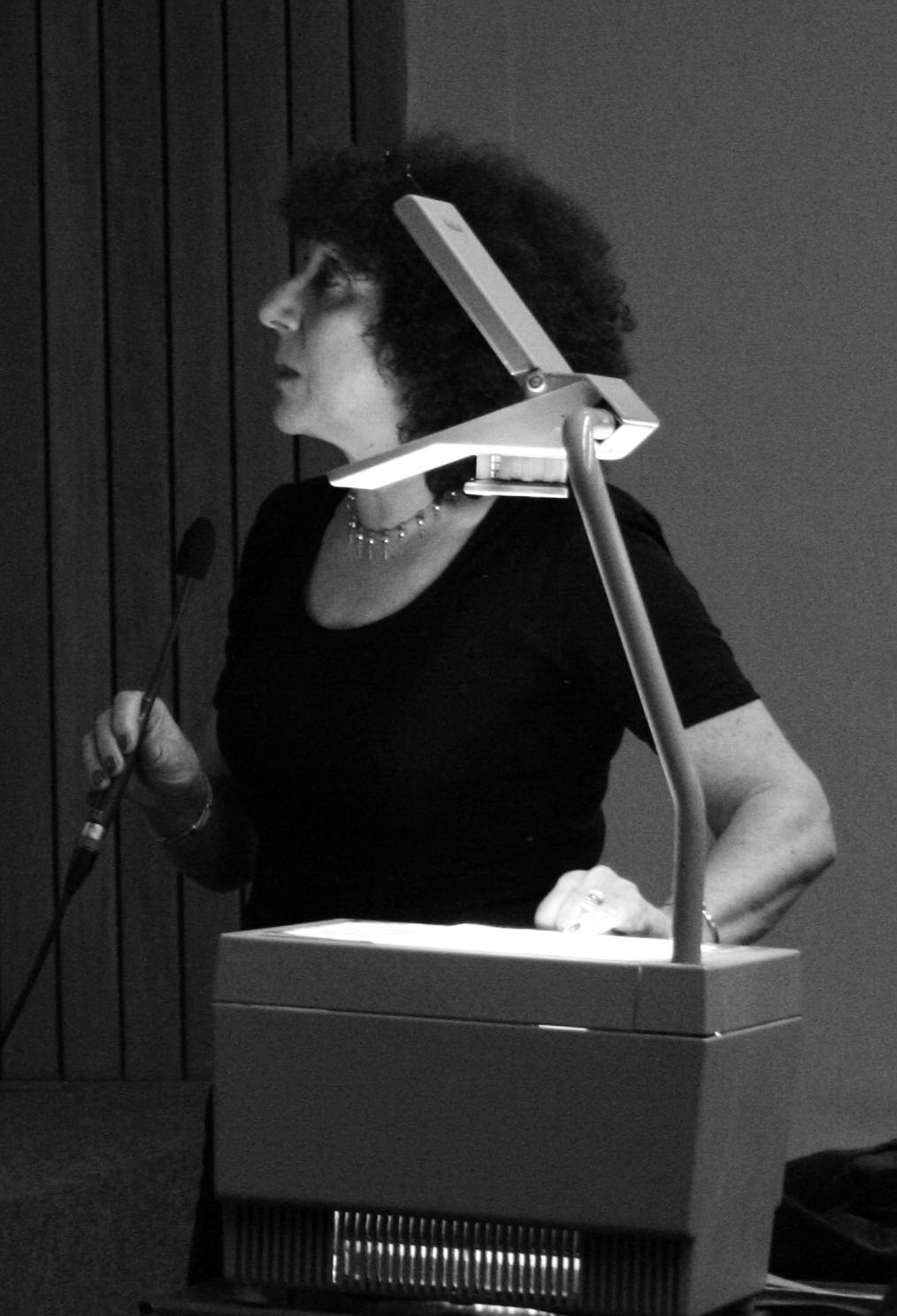
- Portrait of Morelli during a conference at ULB, 2007
- Born: 1948 (age 77–78)
- Other name: Anne Mettewie-Morelli
- Website: Publications by Morelli Anne at ResearchGate

Anne Morelli (born in 1948, also known as Anne Mettewie-Morelli) is a Belgian historian of Italian origins, specialised in the history of religions and minorities. She is currently assistant director of the Centre interdisciplinaire d'étude des religions et de la laïcité of the Université libre de Bruxelles (ULB), where she is a teacher.

== Career ==
In 1995, Morelli directed a book about The Great myths of the history of Belgium, Flanders and Wallonia (Les grands mythes de l'histoire de Belgique, de Flandre et de Wallonie), a global attempt by new historians of Belgium to deconstruct nationalist myths e.g. created by the official historiography for nation-building purpose.

== Philosophy ==
Morelli is an atheist and considers herself as belonging to the far left.

Anne Morelli is particularly known for her opinions on cults or new religious movements. She believes that churches are different from cults only through their relationship to power, and that they are "totalitarian institutions" as well as prisons, hospitals, barracks, boarding houses and some companies.

In 2005, during the 36th annual conference of the International Association of Labour History Institutions in Ghent, she said at the international conference of anti-globalism that no movement has ever achieved a change without using violence. Morelli was part of a group which welcomed Pierre Carette, the main leader of a terrorist group active in 1984-1985, Communist Combatant Cells, when he was released from prison after 17 years, an unusual long imprisonment in Belgium.

Anne Morelli has summarised and systematised the contents of Arthur Ponsonby's classic on war propaganda in "ten commandments of propaganda", which constitute 10 of the essential techniques of propaganda.

1. We do not want war.
2. The enemy alone is to be blamed for the war.
3. The enemy is inherently evil, resembling the devil.
4. We defend a noble cause, not our own interest.
5. The enemy commits atrocities on purpose; our mishaps are involuntary.
6. The enemy uses illegal weapons.
7. We suffer small losses, those of the enemy are enormous.
8. Artists and intellectuals back our cause.
9. Our cause is holy, it has a sacred character.
10. Whoever doubts our propaganda, is a traitor.

On 13 November 2023, she spoke at a wreath laying ceremony in Liège, alongside the Russian ambassador to Belgium.

== Publications ==
- (in French) La Presse italienne en Belgique (1919-1945), 1981
- (in French) La participation des émigrés italiens à la Résistance belge, 1983
- (in Italian) Fascismo e antifascismo nell'emigrazione italiana in Belgio, 1922-1940, 1987
- (in French) Les grands mythes de l'histoire de Belgique, de Flandre et de Wallonie (dir.), 1995
- (in French) Rital-littérature. Anthologie de la littérature des Italiens de Belgique,1996
- (in French) Lettre ouverte à la secte des adversaires des sectes, 1997
- (in French) Les émigrants belges : réfugiés de guerre, émigrés économiques, réfugiés religieux et émigrés politiques ayant quitté nos régions du XVIe à nos jours (dir.),1998
- (in French) Les religions et la violence avec Lemaire Jacques et Suzanne Charles, 1998
- (in French) Le racisme, élément du conflit flamands-francophones ?, 1998
- (in French) Principes élémentaires de propagande de guerre (utilisables en cas de guerre froide, chaude ou tiède...), 2001
- "« Sectes » et « hérésies » de l'antiquité à nos jours" (PDF) (in French). (1.89 MB) - with Alain Dierkens, 2002
- (in French) Les solidarités internationales. Histoire & perspectives with Gotovitch José, 2003
- (in French) Histoire des étrangers et de l'immigration en Belgique: de la préhistoire à nos jours (dir.), 2004
- (in French) Rubino, l'anarchiste qui tenta d’assassiner Léopold II, 2007
