= Mosley (1998 serial) =

British drama television series

- Written by: Laurence Marks; Maurice Gran
- Directed by: John Alexander
- Starring: Jonathan Cake; Hugh Bonneville; Emma Davies; Jemma Redgrave; Richenda Carey
- Theme music composer: Barrington Pheloung
- Country of origin: United Kingdom
- Original language: English
- No. of series: 1
- No. of episodes: 4

Production
- Executive producer: Guy Slater
- Producer: Irving Teitelbaum
- Running time: 197 mins (tv-series) / 99 mins (movie-edition)
- Production company: Alomo Productions

Original release
- Network: Channel 4
- Release: 12 February – 5 March 1998

Mosley was a 1998 four-part television serial produced for Channel 4 based on British fascist Sir Oswald Mosley's life in the period between the two world wars. The series was directed by Robert Knights, from a screenplay by Laurence Marks and Maurice Gran, both better known for their television comedy series. It was based on the books Rules of the Game and Beyond the Pale by Nicholas Mosley, Mosley's son.

The series was released on VHS and DVD.

== Episode details ==
The series was in four parts.

Part 1: Young Man in a Hurry (1918–1920) In 1918, as Britain rejoices at winning the First World War, a young army officer, Tom Mosley (Oswald), decides to run for Parliament. Using friends to gain entry to the most important houses, Mosley soon finds himself introduced to the Prime Minister David Lloyd George and indebted to a sharp-edged American, Maxine Elliott, who in turn will see her debt repaid in the bedroom. Mosley is elected as the youngest member of Parliament and raises his profile by attacking more senior politicians, including his own Prime Minister. Seeing an opportunity to step up in the world by seducing Cynthia (Cimmie) Curzon, the second daughter of Lord Curzon, and he unashamedly seduces her stepmother on the way.

Part 2: Rules of the Game (1924–1927) Mosley's marriage no more guarantees his faithfulness to Cimmie than his election as a Conservative MP guarantees his loyalty to the Party. Deeply immersed in a relationship with Jane Bewley, the wife of a Tory MP, Mosley's politics take him to the left and the new spirit of the Labour Party. But the Party finds Mosley's concepts of economic regeneration unrealistic. Nevertheless, he stands for and wins a front bench seat with the opposition Labour Party, although a blatant sexual scandal may cripple his prospects for the future.

Part 3: Breaking the Mould (1929–1933) Mosley and Cimmie both run for seats with the Labour Party and win as the Party sweeps the old Conservative rule from power. Disappointed that he is not appointed to their newly formed cabinet, Mosley finds comfort in forming his own New Party and forming an attachment with Diana Guinness. It is not long before Cimmie and Mosley's old comrades find themselves at odds with the New Party - both its politics and its methods of enforcement by appointed "stewards." Meanwhile, Benito Mussolini's rise to power in Italy encourages Mosley to remake himself in the mould of a Fascist, once again turning with an opportune tide.

Part 4: Beyond the Pale (1933–1940) Mosley is distraught at the decline in the health of his wife Cimmie who, after years of his philandering, has lost the will to live. Financially supported by Mussolini in Italy, Mosley decides to establish the British Union of Fascists in her honour. While Diana Guinness establishes relationships with Dr. Joseph Goebbels in Germany, Mosley develops a relationship with Cimmie's sister, Alexandra (Baba), in France. At a major meeting of the new organization, hecklers in the audience are beaten to the ground by the Fascist Blackshirts who salute their leader with Roman salutes. On a visit to Germany, Mosley marries Diana Guinness in the company of Joseph Goebbels and Adolf Hitler. But the health of the party will not last long.

== Cast ==
- Jonathan Cake as Sir Oswald 'Tom' Mosley, 6th Bt.
- Jemma Redgrave as Lady Cimmie Curzon
- Hugh Bonneville as Bob Boothby
- Flora Montgomery as Baba (Lady Alexandra Curzon)
- Ralph Riach as Ramsay MacDonald
- Windsor Davies as David Lloyd George
- Gresby Nash as Edward Dudley Metcalfe
- Karl Draper as Makin
- Emma Davies as Diana Mitford Guinness
- Roger May as John Strachey
- Paul Ireland as Allan Young
- Orlando Wells as Cecil Beaton
- Ken Jones as J. H. Thomas
- Eric Allan as Philip Snowden
- Berwick Kaler as Arthur Henderson
- Arturo Venegas as Count Grandi

Part 1

- Debora Weston as Maxine Elliott
- Philip Dunbar as Philip Sassoon
- Robert Lang as Lord Curzon
- Devon Scott as Lady Grace Curzon
- Hugh Simon as Winston Churchill
- Richenda Carey as Lady Mosley
- Dermot Martin as Sgt. O'Sullivan

Part 2

- Caroline Langrishe as Jane Bewley
- Jeremy Child as Major Bewley
- Roger Brierley as Neville Chamberlain
- Edward Highmore as Derek Johnson

Part 3

- Jonathan Coy as Harold Nicolson
- Ben Pullen as Peter Howard
- Sonya Walger as Barbara Hutchinson
- David Henry as William Morris

Part 4

- Stephen Gressieux as Benito Mussolini
- Nigel Davenport as Lord Rothermere
- Colum Convey as William Joyce
- Mike Burnside as Neil Francis Hawkins
- Brigitte Kahn as Margherita Sarfatti
- Anouschka Menzies as Unity Mitford
- Stephan Grothgar as Putzi Hansfstaengl
- John Straiton as James Maxton
- Reinhard Michaels as Adolf Hitler
- Erich Redman as Joseph Goebbels
- William Boscaven as Nicholas Mosley
