= Diana Mosley =

British fascist and writer (1910–2003)

The Honourable Lady Mosley
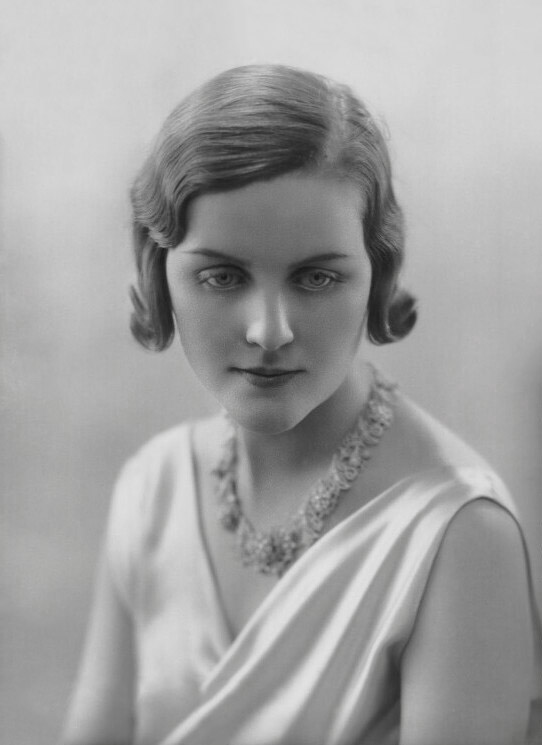
- Mosley in 1932
- Born: Diana Freeman-Mitford; 17 June 1910; London, England
- Died: 11 August 2003 (aged 93); Paris, France
- Occupations: Author; reviewer
- Known for: Writing, Reviewing, Fascist Party
- Spouses: Hon. Bryan Guinness (m. 1929; div. 1932) Sir Oswald Mosley, 6th Baronet (m. 1936; died 1980)
- Children: Jonathan Guinness, 3rd Baron Moyne; Hon. Desmond Guinness; Alexander Mosley; Max Mosley
- Parents: David Freeman-Mitford, 2nd Baron Redesdale (father); Sydney Bowles (mother)
- Relatives: See Mitford family

Diana, Lady Mosley (née Mitford; 17 June 1910 – 11 August 2003), known as Diana Guinness between 1929 and 1936, was a British fascist, aristocrat, writer and editor. She was married to Oswald Mosley, leader of the British Union of Fascists.

Diana was one of the Mitford sisters, six girls born to David Freeman-Mitford, 2nd Baron Redesdale, and his wife Sydney Bowles (1880–1963), namely Nancy (born 1904), Pamela (1907), Diana (1910), Unity (1914), Jessica (1917) and Deborah (1920). The sisters had one brother, Tom (born 1909) who was killed in action in 1945.

She was initially married to Bryan Guinness, heir to the barony of Moyne, and they both became part of a social group of young Bohemian socialites in 1920s London known as the bright young things. Her marriage ended in divorce as she was pursuing a relationship with Oswald Mosley. In 1936, she married Mosley at the home of the propaganda minister for Nazi Germany, Joseph Goebbels, with Adolf Hitler as guest.

Mosley's involvement with Nazi figures and fascist political causes resulted in three years' internment during the Second World War, when Britain was at war with the fascist regime of Nazi Germany. She later moved to Paris and enjoyed some success as a writer. In the 1950s, she contributed diaries to Tatler and edited the fascist magazine The European. In 1977, she published her autobiography, A Life of Contrasts, and in the 1980s she wrote two biographies of leading figures.

Mosley's 1989 appearance on BBC Radio 4's Desert Island Discs caused controversy. Mosley did not quite express Holocaust denial but went as far as to question the extent of Hitler’s involvement, and often stressed in interviews that her own association with Hitler occurred before the Holocaust. She was a regular book reviewer for Books and Bookmen and later at The Evening Standard in the 1990s. Of her beauty, family friend James Lees-Milne wrote "She was the nearest thing to Botticelli's Venus that I have ever seen". She was described by obituary writers such as the historian Andrew Roberts as "unrepentant" about her previous political associations.

== Early life ==
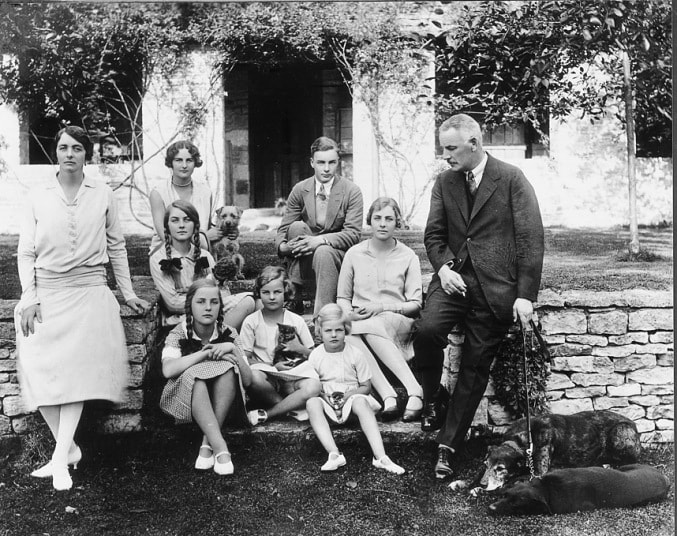
The Mitford family in 1928

Diana Mitford was the fourth child and third daughter of David Freeman-Mitford, 2nd Baron Redesdale (1878–1958), and his wife Sydney (1880–1963). She was a first cousin once removed of Clementine Churchill, second cousin of Sir Angus Ogilvy, and first cousin, twice removed, of Bertrand Russell. She was raised in the country estate of Batsford Park, Gloucestershire, then from the age of 10 at the family home, Asthall Manor in Oxfordshire, and later at Swinbrook House, a home her father had built in the nearby village of Swinbrook in Oxfordshire.

She was educated at home by a series of governesses, except for a six-month period in 1926, when she was sent to a day school in Paris, France. In childhood, her younger sisters Jessica Mitford ("Decca") and Deborah ("Debo", later the Duchess of Devonshire), were particularly devoted to her. At the age of 18, shortly after her presentation at Court, she became secretly engaged to Bryan Guinness.

== Marriages ==
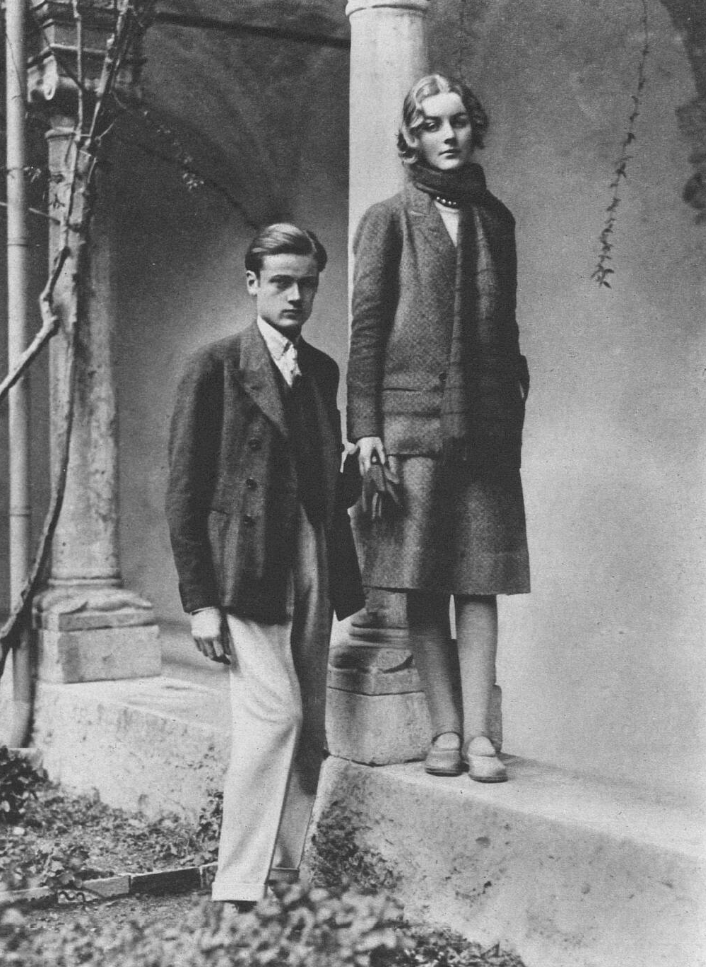
Mitford and Bryan Guinness on their honeymoon in Taormina, Italy, in 1929

Guinness was an Irish aristocrat, writer and brewing heir who would later inherit the barony of Moyne. Diana's parents were initially opposed to the engagement, Sydney being particularly uneasy at the thought of two such young people having possession of such a large fortune, but in time they were persuaded. The marriage took place on 30 January 1929, her sisters Jessica and Deborah being too ill to attend. With an income of £20,000 a year, the couple maintained houses in London and Dublin as well as an estate at Biddesden in Wiltshire. In 1930, Diana's sister Pamela settled in a nearby cottage to run the Biddesden farm.

The Guinnesses were well known for hosting "bright young things" social events. The writer Evelyn Waugh exclaimed that her beauty "ran through the room like a peal of bells", and he dedicated the novel Vile Bodies to her. Portraits of Diana were painted by Augustus John, Pavel Tchelitchew and Henry Lamb. She was one of a series of society beauties photographed as classical figures by Madame Yevonde.

The couple had two sons, Jonathan (1930−2026) and Desmond (1931−2020), but increasingly tensions arose between the sensitive and diffident Guinness, who preferred to remain at home with his family, and Diana, who wanted to travel and to fill the house with her friends. In February 1932, at a garden party at the home of the society hostess Emerald Cunard, Diana met Sir Oswald Mosley who was soon to become leader of the newly formed British Union of Fascists. Although Mosley was already married to Lady Cynthia Mosley, Diana was enamoured and left her husband, "moving with a skeleton staff of nanny, cook, house-parlourmaid and lady's maid to a house at 2 Eaton Square, round the corner from Mosley's flat". Mosley, however, refused to leave his wife. In 1933, Cynthia quite suddenly died of peritonitis. The now widowed Mosley continued to refuse to commit to Diana, starting an affair with his late wife's younger sister, Lady Alexandra Metcalfe. Nevertheless, in June 1933, some four years after their wedding, Diana divorced Guinness.

Diana's parents did not approve of her decision to leave Guinness, and Diana became a "social pariah" and was briefly estranged from most of her family. Her affair with Mosley also strained relationships with her sisters. Jessica and Deborah were initially not permitted to see Diana, for she was "living in sin" with Mosley in London. Deborah eventually came to know Mosley and ended up liking him very much. Jessica on the other hand despised Mosley's beliefs, and became permanently estranged from Diana in the later 1930s. Pamela and her husband Derek Jackson got along well with Mosley. Nancy despised Mosley's political beliefs, but tolerated him for the sake of her relationship with Diana. After the publication of Nancy's 1935 novel Wigs on the Green, satirising Mosley and his beliefs, relations between the sisters became strained-to-non-existent, and it was not until the mid-1940s that they were able to get back to being close again.

Between 1936 and 1939 Diana and Mosley rented Wootton Lodge, a country house in Staffordshire. She furnished her new home with some of the Swinbrook furniture that her father was selling.

== Nazi Germany ==
In 1934, Diana visited Germany with her then 19-year-old sister, Unity Mitford. While there, they attended the first Nuremberg Rally after the Nazi rise to power. Unity later befriended Adolf Hitler and introduced him to Diana in March 1935. Both sisters returned to Nuremberg for the second rally, later in 1935, where they were entertained as guests of the Nazi dictator. In 1936, he provided a Mercedes-Benz to take Diana to the Berlin Olympic games. She became well-acquainted with Winifred Wagner and Magda Goebbels.

Diana and Sir Oswald Mosley married secretly on 6 October 1936 in the drawing room of Nazi propaganda chief Joseph Goebbels in Berlin. Hitler and British fascists Robert Gordon-Canning and Bill Allen were in attendance. The marriage was kept secret until the birth of their first child, Alexander, in 1938. In August 1939, Hitler told Diana over lunch that war was inevitable. Hitler presented the couple with a silver framed picture of himself as a wedding gift.

== World War II Internment ==
For much of World War II (1940-1943), the Mosleys were interned under Defence Regulation 18B, along with other British fascists. Oswald was interned on 23 May 1940 and on 29 June 1940, eleven weeks after the birth of her fourth son (Max), Diana was also arrested. She was taken to a cell in F Block in London's Holloway Prison for women. She and her husband were held without charge or trial under the provisions of 18B, on the advice of MI5.

MI5 documents released in 2002 described Lady Mosley and her political leanings:

"Diana Mosley, wife of Sir Oswald Mosley, is reported on the 'best authority', that of her family and intimate circle, to be a public danger at the present time. Is said to be far cleverer and more dangerous than her husband and will stick at nothing to achieve her ambitions. She is wildly ambitious."

This however was disputed by Diana's sister Deborah in her memoirs, claiming their sister Nancy was inaccurate in her views of Diana Mosley as a national threat.

The couple were initially held separately but, after personal intervention by Prime Minister Winston Churchill, in December 1941, Mosley and two other 18B husbands (one of them Mosley's friend Captain H. W. Luttman-Johnson) were permitted to join their wives at Holloway. After more than three years' imprisonment, they were both released in November 1943 due to Oswald's ill health; they were placed under house arrest until the end of the war, and were denied passports until 1949.

Diana's prison time failed to disturb her approach to life nor alter her fascist politics; she remarked in her later years that she felt better treated than earlier prisoners.

== Post-war ==
After the war ended, the couple kept homes in Ireland, with apartments in London and Paris. Their recently renovated Clonfert home, a former Bishop's palace, burned down in an accidental fire. In her memoirs, Diana blamed her cook, writing that the fire could have been extinguished had it not been for the cook who ran back to her room to retrieve her possessions and in doing so delayed efforts to control the fire. Following this, they moved to a home near Fermoy, County Cork, later settling permanently in France, at the Temple de la Gloire, a Palladian temple in Orsay, southwest of Paris, in 1950 (built in 1801 to honour the French victory of December 1800 at Hohenlinden, near Munich). Gaston and Bettina Bergery had told the Mosleys that the property was on the market. There they were neighbours of the Duke and Duchess of Windsor, who lived in the neighbouring town Gif-sur-Yvette, and soon became their close friends.

Once again they became known for entertaining, but were barred from all functions at the British Embassy. During their time in France, the Mosleys quietly went through another marriage ceremony; Hitler had safeguarded their original marriage licence, and it was never found after the war. During this period, Oswald was unfaithful to Diana, but she found for the most part that she was able to learn to keep herself from getting too upset regarding his adulterous habits. She told an interviewer: "I think if you're going to mind infidelity, you better call it a day as far as marriage goes. Because who has ever remained faithful? I mean, they don't. There's passion and that's it." Diana was also a lifelong supporter of the BUF, and its postwar successor the Union Movement.

At times, she was vague when discussing her loyalties to Britain, her strong belief in fascism, and her attitude to Jews. In her 1977 autobiography A Life of Contrasts, she wrote, "I didn't love Hitler any more than I did Winston [Churchill]. I can't regret it, it was so interesting." In her final interviews with Duncan Fallowell in 2002, she responded that her reaction to the newsreels of death camps was "Well, of course, horror. Utter horror. Exactly the same probably as your reactions." However, when asked about having revulsion against Hitler for this, she said that "I had a complete revulsion against the people who did it but I could never efface from my memory the man I had actually experienced before the war. A very complicated feeling. I can't really relate those two things to each other. I know I'm not supposed to say that but I just have to."

At other times, she behaved so as to suggest intense antisemitic attitudes; the journalist Paul Callan remembered mentioning that he was Jewish while interviewing her husband in Diana's presence. According to Callan, "I mentioned, just in the course of conversation, that I was Jewish—at which Lady Mosley went ashen, snapped a crimson nail and left the room ... No explanation was given but she would later write to a friend: "A nice, polite reporter came to interview Tom [as Mosley was known] but he turned out to be Jewish and was sitting there at our table. They are a very clever race and come in all shapes and sizes." Diana offered to entertain her teenage half-Jewish nephew, Benjamin Treuhaft, on a trip to France. The offer was refused by Benjamin's mother, Jessica, who remained estranged from Diana over the latter's political past. In a 2000 interview with The Guardian, Diana said that "Maybe instead they [European Jews] could have gone somewhere like Uganda: very empty and a lovely climate" (a reference to the British Uganda Programme proposed by Zionists to establish a semi-autonomous Jewish territory in British East Africa in 1903).

Her appearance on the BBC Radio 4 programme Desert Island Discs with Sue Lawley in 1989 remains controversial due to Mosley's Holocaust denial and admiration of Hitler. Mosley told Lawley that she had not believed the extermination of Jews by Nazi Germany until "years" after the war, and that she thought the reported number of six million Jewish victims was too high. The broadcast of this episode had to be rescheduled several times because it kept coinciding with Jewish holidays and prompted hundreds of complaints to the BBC. In 2016, a writer at the BBC described it as the most controversial of all Desert Island Discs episodes. Her choices of music to be played on Desert Island Discs were: Symphony No. 41 (Mozart), "Casta Diva" from Norma (Bellini), "Ode to Joy" (Beethoven), Die Walküre (Wagner), Liebestod (Wagner), "L'amour est un oiseau rebelle" from Carmen (Bizet), "A Whiter Shade of Pale" (Procol Harum) and Polonaise in F-sharp minor (Chopin).

After their early twenties, Diana and her sister Jessica only saw each other once, when they met for half an hour as their elder sister, Nancy, lay dying in Versailles. Diana said of Jessica in 1996, "I quite honestly don't mind what Decca [Jessica] says or thinks," adding that "She means absolutely nothing to me at all. Not because she's a Communist but simply because she's a rather boring person, really".

In 1998, due to her advancing age, she moved out of the Temple de la Gloire and into an apartment in the 7th arrondissement of Paris. Temple de la Gloire was sold in 2000 for £1 million. Throughout much of her life, particularly after her years in prison, she was afflicted by regular bouts of migraines. In 1981, she had surgery to remove a brain tumour. She convalesced at Chatsworth House, the residence of her sister Deborah. In the early 1990s, she was also treated for skin cancer. In later life, she also suffered from deafness.

Mosley attended the funeral of René de Chambrun, the son-in-law of Vichy France Prime Minister Pierre Laval, in 2002.

== Writer ==
Mosley was shunned in the British media for a period after the war, and the couple established their own publishing company, Euphorion Books, named after a character in Goethe's Faust. This allowed Oswald to publish, and Diana was free to commission a cultural list. After his release from jail, Oswald declared the death of fascism. Diana initially translated Goethe's Faust. Other notable books published by Euphorion under her aegis included La Princesse de Clèves (translated by Nancy, 1950), Niki Lauda's memoirs (1985), and neo-Nazi Hans-Ulrich Rudel's memoirs, Stuka Pilot. She also edited several of her husband's books.

While in France, Mosley edited the fascist cultural magazine The European for six years, and sometimes contributed material to it. She provided articles, book reviews, and regular diary entries. Many of her contributions were republished in 2008 in The Pursuit of Laughter. In 1965, she was commissioned to write the regular column "Letters from Paris" for Tatler. She reviewed autobiographical and biographical accounts as well as the occasional novel. Characteristically she would provide commentary of her own experiences and personal information of the subject of the book under discussion. She wrote regularly for Books and Bookmen. Her 1980 review of a biography on Magda Goebbels attracted attention from Christopher Hitchens. Hitchens objected to a passage where Mosley wrote: "Everyone knows the tragic end. As the Russians surrounded Berlin, the Goebbels painlessly killed their children and then themselves. The dead children were described by people who saw them as looking 'peacefully asleep'. Those who condemn this appalling, Masada-like deed must consider the alternative facing the distraught Magda." Hitchens insisted that the New Statesman issue an editorial condemning the Masada trope. In her eighties, Mosley became the lead reviewer for the London Evening Standard during A. N. Wilson's seven-year tenure as literary editor. In 1996, following Wilson's departure, his successor was asked by the new editor of the newspaper, Max Hastings, to stop running Mosley's reviews. Hastings is reported to have said that he did not want any more "bloody Lady Hitler" in the newspaper.

Mosley wrote the foreword and introduction of Nancy Mitford: A Memoir by Harold Acton. She produced her own two books of memoirs: A Life of Contrasts (1977, Hamish Hamilton), and Loved Ones (1985). The latter is a collection of pen portraits of close relatives and friends (including of writer Evelyn Waugh, amongst others). In 1980, she released The Duchess of Windsor, a biography of her friend Wallis Simpson.

In 2007, letters between the Mitford sisters, including communications to and from Diana, were published in the compilation The Mitfords: Letters Between Six Sisters, edited by Charlotte Mosley. A following collection consisting of her letters, articles, diaries and reviews was released as The Pursuit of Laughter in December 2008.

== Death ==
Mosley died in Paris in August 2003, aged 93. Her cause of death was given as complications related to a stroke she had suffered a week earlier, but reports later surfaced that she had been one of the many elderly fatalities of the heat wave of 2003 in mostly non-air-conditioned Paris. She was buried at St Mary's Churchyard, Swinbrook, Oxfordshire, alongside her sisters.

Mosley was survived by her four sons: Jonathan and Desmond Guinness, and Alexander and Max Mosley. Her stepson Nicholas Mosley was a novelist who also wrote a critical memoir of his father for which Mosley reportedly never forgave him, despite their previously close relationship. A great-granddaughter, Jasmine Guinness, a great-niece, Stella Tennant and a granddaughter, Daphne Guinness are models. Her grandson Louis Mosley is the CEO of Palantir UK.

Following her death, British journalist Andrew Roberts criticised Mosley in the pages of The Daily Telegraph (16 August 2003), reporting that when he interviewed her for his book Eminent Churchillians, she had surprised him by not serving up a "David Irving-style refutation" of the Holocaust but instead declaring "I'm sure he [Hitler] was to blame for the extermination of the Jews. He was to blame for everything, and I say that as someone who approved of him." However, her other remarks about Hitler showed the lifelong "same disdain for equivocation" she had always displayed, prompting him to call her an "unrepentant Nazi and effortlessly charming", and her views "disgusting, unchanged" and "repulsive". A. N. Wilson wrote for the same newspaper and said that her public loyalty to Oswald and Hitler were disastrous mistakes, claiming that privately Mosley had admitted that the Nazis were "really rather awful". Three days later, letters to the editor from both her son, Jonathan Guinness, Lord Moyne, and his daughter (her granddaughter), Daphne Guinness, attempted to refute Roberts' statements by citing her "lack of hypocrisy", claiming Mosley's "upper-class etiquette" would prohibit giving any sort of explanation or an apology to a journalist, and by saying that regardless of her giving a Hitler salute during the singing of God Save The King in 1935, she was never a threat to wartime Britain.

A sarcastic commentary by Canadian columnist Mark Steyn appeared in the same issue. He described Mosley’s unwavering allegiance to Hitler and fascism as that of "a silly kid". An equally "indulgently dismissive attitude" of her opinions was seconded in the Sunday edition in an interview with her stepson Nicholas Mosley, with whom she had refused to speak for over two decades after the publication of Beyond the Pale, his unfavourable memoir of her husband.

== Portrayal ==
Mosley is the inspiration for the protagonist of the 2018 novel After the Party by Cressida Connolly.

She is portrayed by Emma Davies in the 1998 Channel 4 series Mosley; by Amber Anderson extensively in the sixth and final season (2022) of Peaky Blinders; and by Joanna Vanderham in the 2025 British historical drama series Outrageous.

In 2025, Elisabeth Dermot Walsh portrayed Mosley in the touring stage production The Party Girls.

In 2027, Miranda Richardson portrayed Mosley in the film My Duchess.

== Bibliography (authored monographs) ==
- A Life of Contrasts (1977)
- Loved Ones (1985)
- The Duchess of Windsor (1980)
- The Pursuit of Laughter (2008)
- Provided introduction and foreword to Nancy Mitford: A Memoir by Harold Acton (1975)
- Collection of letters between the six Mitford sisters: The Mitfords: Letters Between Six Sisters (2007)

== Sources ==
- Dalley, Jan (1999). Diana Mosley: a life. London: Faber & Faber. ISBN 0-571-14448-9.
- de Courcy, Anne (2003). Diana Mosley: Mitford Beauty, British Fascist, Hitler's Angel. New York: HarperCollins. ISBN 9780062381675.
- de Courcy, Anne. Diana Mosley née Mitford. Le Rocher. (French edition)
- Guinness, Jonathan; Guinness, Catherine (1984). The House of Mitford. London: Hutchinson. ISBN 0-09-155560-4.
- Lovell, Mary S. (2001). The Mitford Girls (paperback ed.). London: Abacus. ISBN 978-0-349-11505-4.
- Mosley, Charlotte (2007). The Mitfords: letters between six sisters. London: Fourth Estate. ISBN 978-1-84115-790-0.
- Mosley, Diana (2003) [1977]. A Life of Contrasts (paperback ed.). London: Gibson Square. ISBN 1-903933-20-X.
- Mosley, Diana (1985). Loved Ones. London: Sidgwick & Jackson. ISBN 0-283-99155-0.
