= Mary Curzon =

Mary Curzon may refer to:

- Mary Curzon, Baroness Curzon of Kedleston (1870–1906), peeress of American background
  - Mary Irene Curzon, 2nd Baroness Ravensdale (1896–1966), her daughter
- Mary Curzon, Lady Howe (1887–1962), English aristocrat
