= History of Kaziranga National Park =

The history of Kaziranga National Park in the Golaghat and Nagaon districts of the state of Assam, India, can be traced back to the beginning of the twentieth century, in 1904. It now is a World Heritage Site and hosts two-thirds of the world's Great One-horned Rhinoceroses, tigers, and many other endangered animals.

== Reserve Forest ==
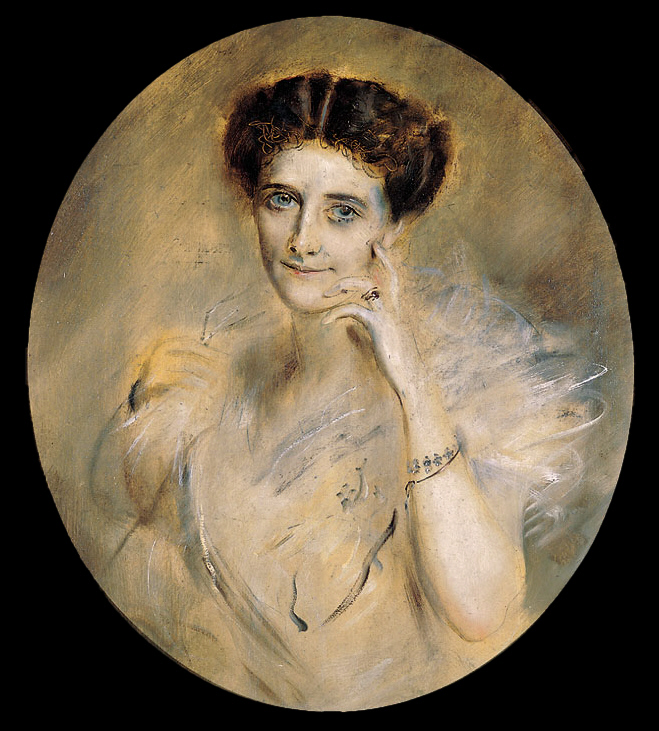
Baroness Curzon, Mary Victoria Leiter Curzon who requested the creation of the Kaziranga conservation area in 1904

In the early nineteenth century, the area around what is now Kaziranga National Park was not well settled. It was notorious for wild animals, malaria, frequent floods, and unpredictable changes in the course of the Brahmaputra River. Historical records of the forest called Kaziranga date to the seventeenth century. Several local legends relates to the origin of its name, but historians suggest that the name relate to Karbi, a woman who ruled the region at one time. With the rise of the tea industry in Assam, slowly, the forests in the area were cleared for settlements and tea plantations. The local villagers practiced some slash-and-burn cultivation, while the British established small permanent colonies for tea cultivation.

During the Nineteenth Century, megafauna populations in Assam were systematically destroyed as a result of hunting by British soldiers. Major John Butler of Bengal Native Infantry wrote in 1855 that it was not uncommon for three soldiers "to shoot thirty buffalos, twenty deer, a dozen hogs, besides one or two tigers and rhinoceroses. Captain Pollock, a British military engineer wrote that one or two rihnos or buffalos were shot dead before every breakfast. "the vast eThe history of protection in Kaziranga dates back to the early twentieth century, when Baroness Mary Victoria Leiter Curzon, an American who was the wife of Lord Curzon, the Viceroy of India, first visited the Kaziranga area in 1904. Kaziranga had been renowned for its rhinoceros population, however, during her trips in the region, Baroness Curzon failed to see any rhinoceros, seeing only some hoof marks.

It is rumored that the noted Assamese animal tracker, Balaram Hazarika, showed Baroness Curzon around Kaziranga and impressed upon her the urgent need for conservation of the wildlife. Concerned about the dwindling numbers of rhinoceros, she asked her husband to take the necessary action to save the rhinoceros, which he did on 4 November 1904 when he proposed the creation of a reserve in Kaziranga.

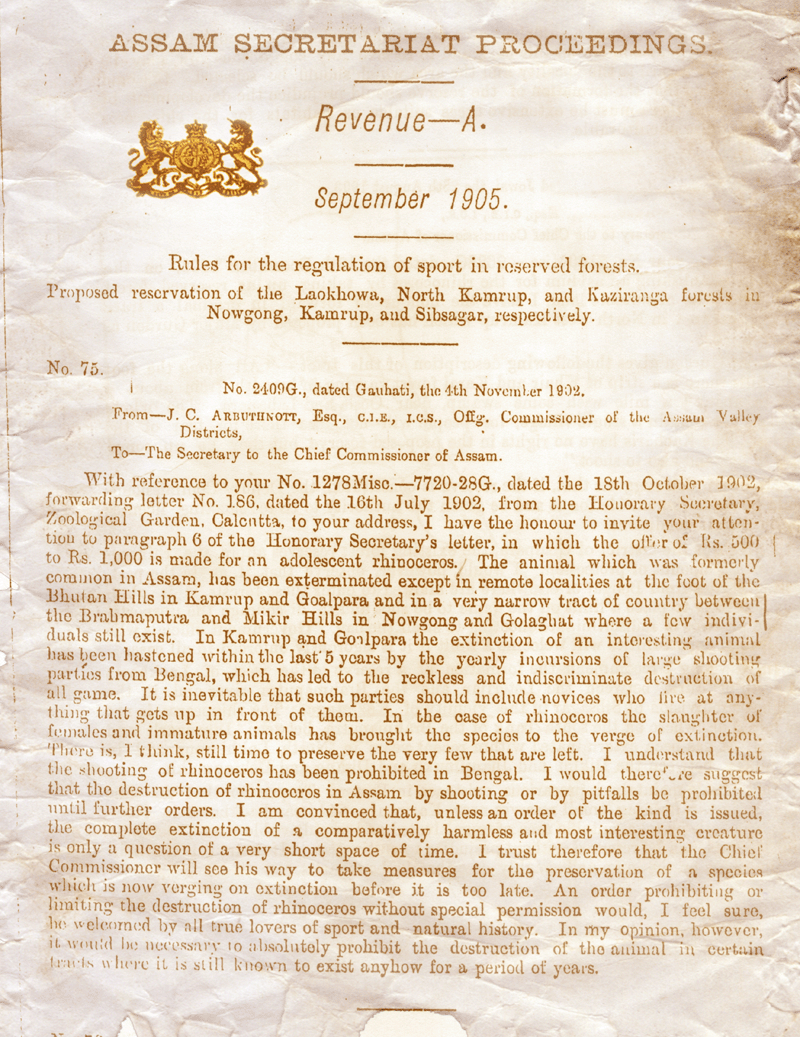
Formal document regarding the 4 November 1904 proposal for the establishment of the Kaziranga Reserve Forest, dated September 1905

Thus the Kaziranga Proposed Reserve Forest was created on 57,273.6 acres (231.778 km^{2}) of land, on 1 June 1905 by notification of the Chief Commissioner of the area.

A proposal soon was made to extend the Kaziranga Reserve Forest by including a piece of land to the east of the existing reserve toward the Bokakhat Dhansirimukh road. Local people objected to this as their rights regarding such things as grazing, fishing, collection of cane, thatch, and firewood would be in danger. The European community of tea planters also objected to the proposal, mainly on the grounds that the area available for big game hunts would be greatly reduced. Another objection was that during the rainy season there had been a good deal of boating down the Diphlu river and the Mora Dhansiri River through which tea from the neighboring tea gardens was taken to the Brahmaputra River. At last with the interventions of the forest settlement officer and deputy commissioner, Sibsagar District Major A. Playfair, an area of 13,506 acres (54.66 km^{2}) was added to the Kaziranga reserve vide notification No.295 R dated 28 January 1913.

In later years another proposal was made to add extra land toward the north of the reserve, to provide shelter for the wild animals during flooding, as the ground was comparatively higher, and also to protect the wild animals from the danger of possible epidemics spreading through the domestic livestock. The presence of a large number of domestic buffaloes belonging to Nepali grazers in the proposed area caused much delay in the final making of the Reserved Forest, however, the chief commissioner decided in favour of making the reserve, and finally, an area of 37,529 acres (151.87 km^{2}) of land extending the Kaziranga Reserve up to the Brahmaputra River was notified vide notification No.3560 R dated 26 July 1917.

Additions to the protected area continued and an area of 151 acres (0.6 km^{2}) was added further to the Kaziranga reserve vide notification No.FOF/WL/512/66/17 on 7 April 1967 extending the reserve to the south of the National Highway No.37 to provide a corridor for the animals to cross over safely to the Karbi Anglong Hills during flooding.

== National Park ==
The proposal to declare Kaziranga as a National Park was taken up by the then Chief Conservator of Forests, P. Baruah. To achieve this objective, "The Assam National Park Act of 1968" was passed by the Government of Assam, as there was no provision to create a National Park under the existing Forest Regulations. Kaziranga National Park was established on 11 February 1974, with an area of 429.93 square kilometres vide notification No.FOR/WL/722/68.

Later several new areas were added to the National Park. The first addition (area 43.79 km^{2} on 28 May 1977), the second addition (area 6.47 km^{2} vide preliminary notification on 10 July 1985), third addition (area 0.69 km^{2} on 31 May 1985), fourth addition (area 0.89 km^{2} on 3 August 1988), fifth addition (area 1.15 km^{2} on 13 June 1985), and the sixth additions (area 376.50 km^{2} on 7 August 1999) were made. Two reserve forests Panbari (1,894 acres; 8 km^{2}) and Kukurakata (3,936 acres; 16 km^{2}) also came under the administrative control of the Kaziranga National Park.

The park formally became a Reserve Forest in 1908, a game sanctuary in 1916, and it was closed officially for shooting in 1926. Kaziranga was thrown open to visitors in 1938. After the independence of India, Kaziranga was declared a Wildlife Sanctuary in 1950. In 1954 the Assam Legislative Assembly gave the rhinoceros legal protection through the Assam (Rhinoceros) Bill that laid down heavy penalties for killing any of them. In 1974 Kaziranga was designated a National Park, the first national park in the state of Assam. UNESCO declared Kaziranga a World Heritage Site in 1985. Additional lands have been incorporated into the park, and a proposal to add some 454.50 square kilometres has been put forward to include the adjoining section of the Brahmaputra River to the north and part of the Karbi Anglong to the south, to provide a protected refuge where animals may take shelter during floods.

Before 1950 the tourist facilities were limited and the accommodations consisted mainly of a Public Works Department inspection bungalow at Kaziranga and a Forest rest house at Baguri. These accommodations were found highly inadequate to meet the demands of increasing number of visitors to the park. Solutions implemented for this problem were one visitor's camp at Kaziranga and later on two tourist lodge, constructed by the department on a small hillock at Kohora as well as one Forest Rest House constructed at Arimora. The management of these two Tourist Lodges was handed over to the State Tourism Department in 1963 after the creation of this new department under the Government of Assam.

Unlike Manas National Park in Assam, the ULFA separatist movement in Assam did not affect the park's wildlife or tourism adversely, in fact, it has been reported that the ULFA "tried" and executed rhinoceros poachers in the late 1980s.

Severe losses to the number of wildlife occurred during floods, events worth mention include the floods of 1973 in which several animals were killed. In 1988 a devastating flood ravaged the park in which 70% of the park was submerged under water killing 38 rhinoceros, including 23 calves, 1,050 deer, 69 wild boar, three baby elephants, two tigers, and numerous smaller species. In 1996 44 rhinoceros were killed by floods. In 1998 due to exceptionally heavy rainfall the Brahmaputra River flooded and parts of the park were under 6 metres of water. More than a square kilometre area of the floodplain was washed away; an estimated 652 animals, including 42 rhinoceroses, were lost. During that time WWF-India provided material assistance and the Indian army constructed ten islands on high ground for wildlife.

The park celebrated its centenary with much fanfare in 2005, inviting descendants of Baroness and Lord Curzon for the celebrations, and combining the celebrations with the annual Kaziranga Elephant Festival.

== See also ==
- Kaziranga National Park
