= Grace Curzon, Marchioness Curzon of Kedleston =

British-American noble (1885–1958)

The Most Honourable The Marchioness Curzon of Kedleston GBE
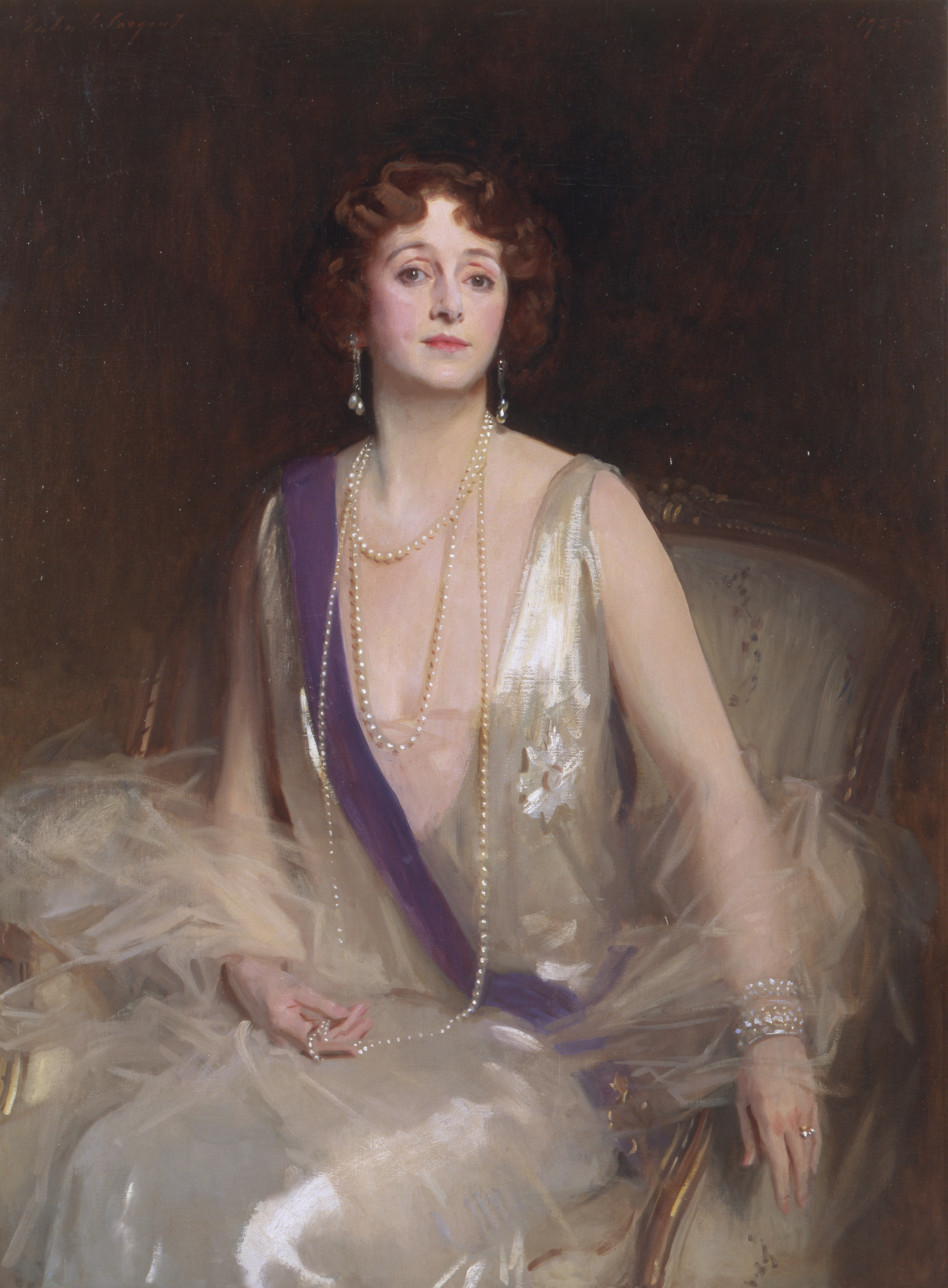
- The Marchioness by John Singer Sargent, 1925.
- Born: Grace Elvina Hinds; 14 April 1879; Decatur, Alabama, U.S.
- Died: 6 June 1958 (aged 79) near Dover, England
- Spouses: Alfredo Huberto Duggan (m. 1902; died 1915); George Curzon, 1st Marquess Curzon of Kedleston (m. 1917; died 1925)
- Children: Alfred Duggan; Hubert Duggan; Grace Duggan Rice

Grace Elvina Curzon, Marchioness Curzon of Kedleston, GBE (née Hinds, formerly Duggan; 14 April 1879 – 29 June 1958), was an American-born British marchioness and the second wife of George Curzon, former Viceroy of India.

== Early life ==
Curzon was born Grace Elvina Hinds in 1879 in Decatur, Alabama, a daughter of Joseph Monroe Hinds (1842–1901), former U.S. Consul General to Brazil in Rio de Janeiro, and Lucia Annita Trillia (1851–1941), a former British subject from Montevideo, Uruguay.

Grace grew up in a "great colonial mansion with 'banks of roses'", and although her father was a resident of Alabama, he fought with the Union Army as a captain of a cavalry company during the American Civil War. The family "had a flair for social life," travelling often and introducing Grace to the prominent people of the age, including U.S. President Grover Cleveland at the White House.

== Marriages and issue ==
=== First marriage ===
On 1 May 1902, she married her first husband, Alfredo Huberto Duggan (1875–1915), a first generation Irish Argentine from Buenos Aires. In 1905, Duggan was appointed to the Argentine Legation in London where the family thereafter moved. Together, they were the parents of three children, two sons and a daughter:

- Alfredo "Alfred" Léon Duggan (1903–1964), a historical novelist who was the best-selling historical novelist during the 1950s; he married Laura Hill in 1953.
- Hubert John Duggan (1904–1943), a British Member of Parliament; he married Joan Dunn, the daughter of Sir James Dunn, in 1928 and they were divorced a year later.
- Grace Lucille Marcella Duggan (1907–1995), she married Edward Denis Rice and they were the parents of Caroline Helen Rice (1931–2016), wife of Other Windsor-Clive, 3rd Earl of Plymouth.

When Grace was presented at Court, she stood behind fellow American Nancy Langhorne Shaw, who married Waldorf Astor (later 2nd Viscount Astor) in 1906 and became an MP in her own right. She was also a friend of Lady Randolph Churchill, the American-born mother of Sir Winston Churchill, and of Consuelo Vanderbilt, the wife of the 9th Duke of Marlborough.

Grace Duggan was a wealthy woman after her husband's death in 1915, inheriting an estate of more than $18,000,000, which included eighteen large estancias in South America. In 1916, Philip de László painted her as a widow.

=== Second marriage ===
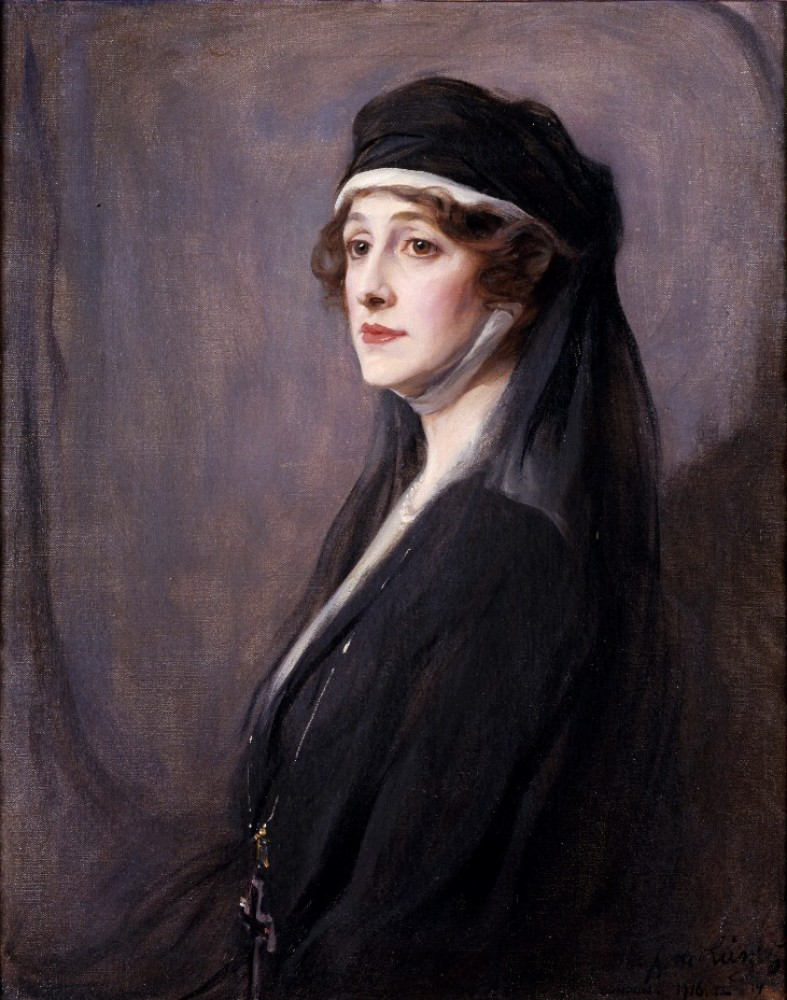
Portrait by László before her second marriage in 1916 in nurse's uniform

On 2 January 1917, aged 37, she became the second wife of Lord Curzon. On the occasion of their marriage, Lord Curzon bought Bodiam Castle in East Sussex, a 14th-century building that had been gutted during the English Civil War. They restored it extensively, then bequeathed it to the National Trust. In 1923, when Curzon was passed over for the office of Prime Minister partly on the advice of Arthur Balfour, Balfour joked that Curzon 'has lost the hope of glory but he still possesses the means of Grace".

Curzon had three daughters from his first marriage to Mary Victoria Leiter, Baroness Curzon of Kedleston: Mary Irene, Lady Ravensdale (born 20 January 1896); Cynthia Blanche (born 23 August 1898), the first wife of Sir Oswald Mosley; and Alexandra Naldera (born 20 April 1904), the wife of Edward Dudley Metcalfe, the best friend, best man and equerry of Edward VIII.

Despite her fertility-related operations and several miscarriages, the couple did not produce an heir. This eroded their marriage, which ended in separation but not divorce. Letters from Curzon to Grace in the early 1920s indicate that they remained devoted to each other.

== Later life ==
In the 1922 New Year Honours list, she was appointed Dame Grand Cross of the Order of the British Empire (GBE) for "services rendered during the War to the British Red Cross Society, and to the Soldiers' and Sailors' Families Association, the Belgian -Soldiers' Club, and Queen Alexandra's Nursing' Association."

In 1925, her portrait was painted by the American artist John Singer Sargent. This oil on canvas painting, which measures 129.22 × 92.39 cm (50.9 × 36.4 in), was Sargent's last oil portrait. The painting was purchased in 1936 by the Currier Museum of Art in Manchester, New Hampshire.

Lady Curzon died on 29 June 1958 near Dover in Kent.
