= The Pursuit of Laughter =

2008 collection of diaries, articles, reviews and portraits by Diana Mosley

- Author: Diana Mosley; Martin Rynja (editor)
- Language: English
- Genre: Collection
- Publisher: Gibson Square
- Publication date: 2008
- Publication place: United Kingdom
- Media type: Print (Hardback & Paperback) (2009)
- Pages: 473
- ISBN: 1-906142-10-6
- OCLC: 311080462
- Preceded by: The Mitfords: Letters Between Six Sisters

The Pursuit of Laughter is a 2008 collection of diaries, articles, reviews and portraits by Diana Mosley (née Mitford). The book was published by Gibson Square and edited by Martin Rynja. Mosley's sister, Deborah Cavendish, Duchess of Devonshire, provides the introduction. The title is a homage to another Mitford sister's book, Nancy Mitford's The Pursuit of Love.

== Overview ==
The book includes several of her articles, diaries and book reviews previously published in The European, a magazine she also edited during its tenure in the 1950s. Similar works published for publications such as Tatler, London Evening Standard, The Spectator, The Daily Mail, The Times, The Sunday Times and Books & Bookmen have also been republished. The collection also includes selected portraits from her 1977 autobiography, A Life of Contrasts and her 1985 publication of pen portraits, Loved Ones.

== Reception ==
The book received a wide UK release in December 2008 and was generally favourably reviewed, although several reviewers were not able to reconcile Mosley's previous association with fascism and Nazism (Mosley was the wife of Oswald Mosley, former leader of the British Union of Fascists).

The book has also been satirized by the "Digested Read" column in The Guardian.

Valerie Grove of The Times attempted to distance herself from any political position in reviewing the book "I hope I can praise Diana Mosley without being suspected of fascist sympathies". She continued with praise "Her opening gambits are arresting... Dipping into this book at your bedside is like browsing in a great nonfiction library stuffed with lives and letters, each subject brightly and sharply illuminated."

David Sexton of the Evening Standard described the book as "Sharp, funny, debunking." But he criticised her political positions citing "her completely unrepentant support not just of her beloved Mosley but of "the Führer" as she continued to call him (attentive to titles, she liked to snub Churchill by referring to him as "Mr Churchill") is ultimately indefensible and that fact has to be faced, not sidestepped or swept under the carpet."

Writing in the Daily Telegraph reviewer Duncan Fallowell questioned Mosley's contradictions between her personal and political life. Fallowell described the publication; "this strange, fascinating book revives the turbulence at a time when the Mitford industry seemed to be moving into a cosy corner. It is made up mostly of book reviews but her agile mind and the sulphurous life lend them weight."

"It represents the life in writing of a fascinating woman...these writings are testimony to the sheer rigour of her thought and the crispness and elegance of her prose...Her command of history and understanding of the machinations of politics are formidable, and evident in pieces on the Dreyfus affair, Suez crisis and Profumo scandal." Catherine Heaney, Irish Times

The Sunday Telegraph recently selected the book for its section "pick of the paperback". The reviewers praised Mosley's "love of laughter and witty observation of friends such as Evelyn Waugh, Harold Acton and James Lees-Milne" and described her recollection as a "delight". They also described the book as a "fascinating" collection.

Rachel Cooke of The Observer reviewed the book negatively as a "pointless and badly edited collection" and continued to add that "if a book is not going to deal with the problem of Diana's politics, then at least let it give us a little of her wit. The Pursuit of Laughter does neither and thus the Diana who emerges from its pages is, unforgivably, nothing more than a snobbish dullard with a startling line in rhetorical leaps."

== Contents ==
- Editor's Note (V)
- Foreword by Deborah Devonshire (9)
- The 30s and 40s (17)
- On Love and Sex (103)
- Diaries 1953-1959 (143)
- A Talent to Annoy (Germany) (203)
- Champs Elysées (France) (297)
- U and Non-U (Britain) (353)
- The Lives of Others (393)
- Three Portraits (413)

Acknowledgements (466) Index (467)
