= Balaram Hazarika =

Indian animal tracker

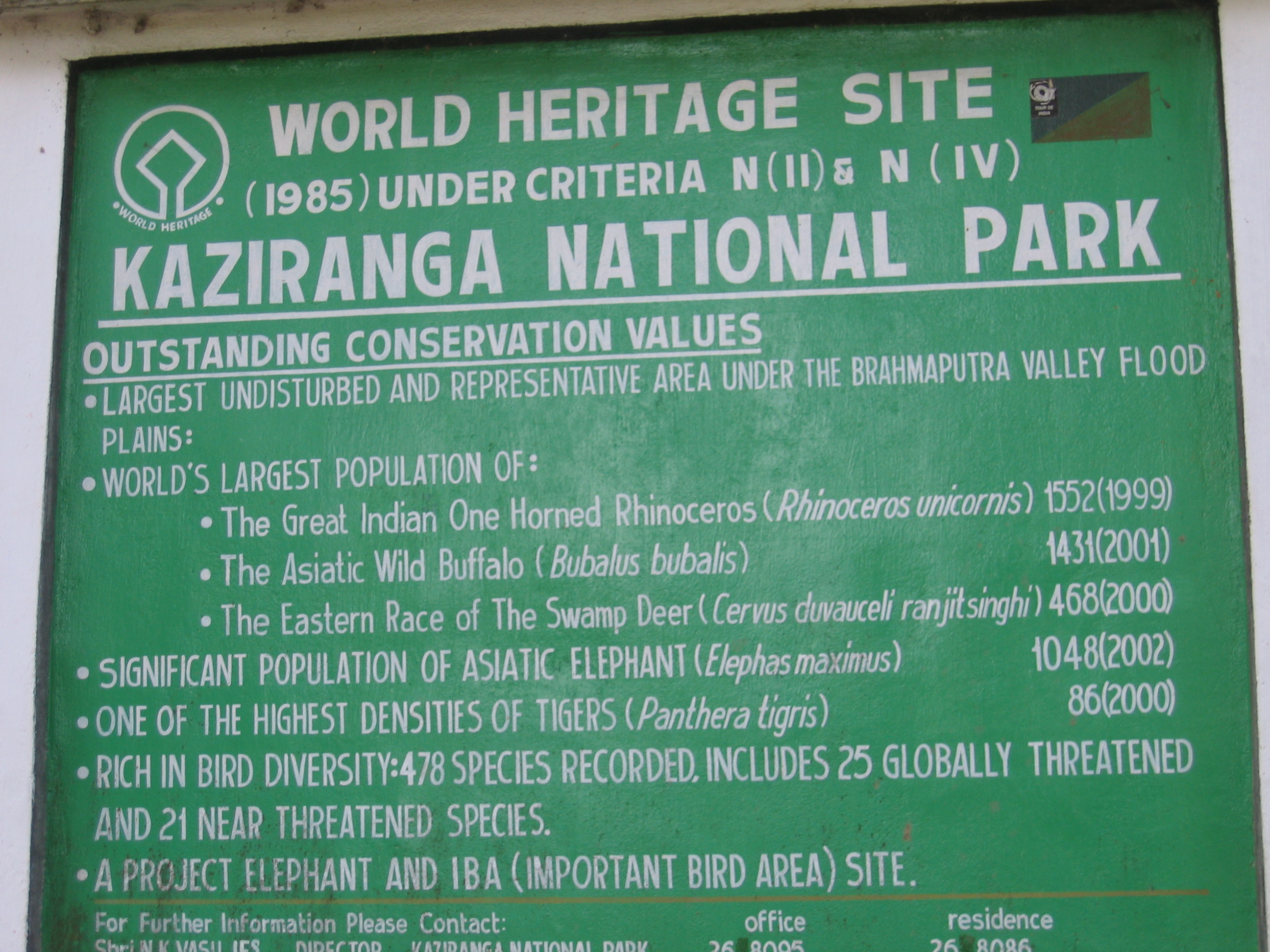
Kaziranga National Park, created as a result of advocacy by Hazarika

Balaram Hazarika (alias Nigona Shikari) was a noted Assamese animal tracker who showed Lady Curzon around Kaziranga and impressed upon her his urgency of wildlife conservation. Concerned about the dwindling numbers of rhinoceros, she asked her husband, Lord Curzon, the Viceroy of India, to take necessary political action to save the rhinoceros.
