= The European (1953 magazine) =

Defunct English language magazine (1953–1959)

- Editor: Diana Mosley
- Categories: Culture, politics
- Frequency: Monthly
- First issue: 1953
- Final issue: 1959
- Company: Euphorion Books
- Country: France
- Based in: Orsay
- Language: English

The European was a limited-circulation political and cultural magazine published between 1953 and 1959. It was edited by Diana Mosley of the Mitford family. As Diana Mitford, Mosley had been one of the bright young things and had cultivated friendships with several of the contributors to the magazine. These included Ezra Pound, Henry Williamson, and Roy Campbell. The magazine was published by Euphorion Books, a publishing company formed by Mosley and her husband, Sir Oswald Mosley, founder of the pre-war British Union of Fascists.

== Overview ==
It was initially founded as a platform for Sir Oswald to raise consciousness of his doctrine of Europe a Nation. The publication also stressed the importance that Britain should join the European Economic Community. Although the majority of contributors were pro-Europe, the magazine, according to Diana Mosley, was an "open forum". The Economist said that the magazine "echoed Mosley's views." In 2009, it was described as a "cultural magazine" by the Evening Standard. Diana Mosley's biographer, Jan Dalley, wrote that the magazine was devised for Oswald Mosley to reach a more intellectual and middle-class audience. Mosley included a European editorial, but Dalley says, "Diana preferred to fill it with book reviews and notices of plays and films, even articles about food and cookery, to the dismay of the old guard."

== Contributors ==
In addition to editing the magazine, Diana Mosley contributed regular diary entries, articles, and book reviews. Several of these contributions were republished in the 2008 book The Pursuit of Laughter, a collection of journalism by Mosley.

In July 1956, Diana wrote the essay, "The Writing of Rebecca West", later republished in 1986.

Desmond Stewart and Alan Neame were regular contributors, and Diana also arranged contributions by Ezra Pound, Henry Williamson, Roy Campbell, Anna Kavan, Hugo Charteris, and Nicholas Mosley.

== See also ==
- Other publications with the same name
