= The Duchess of Windsor (Mosley biography) =

- Author: Diana Mosley
- Language: English
- Genre: Biography
- Publisher: (1980) Sidgwick & Jackson, (2003) Gibson Square
- Publication date: 1980 and 2003
- Publication place: United Kingdom
- Media type: Print (Hardback & Paperback)
- Pages: 224 (1980), 304 (2003)
- ISBN: 0-283-98628-X
- OCLC: 6721949
- Dewey Decimal: 941.084/092/4 B 19
- LC Class: DA581.W5 M67 1980
- Preceded by: A Life of Contrasts
- Followed by: Loved Ones

The Duchess of Windsor is a 1980 biography of Wallis, Duchess of Windsor by Diana Mosley. The book was commissioned by Lord Longford and published by Sidgwick & Jackson and again by Gibson Square in 2003. In Paris, Mosley and her husband Oswald Mosley were long-term neighbours and friends of Wallis, Duchess of Windsor and Edward VIII. On 26 June 1980, she was interviewed by Russell Harty on the BBC to discuss the project. The earlier edition sold 23, 000 copies according to Mosley's biographer, Jan Dalley.

== Synopsis ==
The American divorcée (Simpson) attracted media attention when she married Edward VIII of the United Kingdom. Due to the divisive political issue of the proposed marriage, the king was forced to abdicate the throne in order to pursue marriage with Simpson. The author (Mosley) was a confidante and neighbour of the Duchess.

== Later editions ==
In the revised 2003 edition, Mosley addresses latest allegations of secret service reports about the Windsors' conduct during the war and the abdication.

Simpson returned to the public consciousness with the release of the biopic W.E. in 2012. Mosley's biography was re-released in 2012 and an extract was published by the Daily Express.

== Contents ==
The book has been published in both paperback and hardback and also features several illustrations.

- Acknowledgements (6)
- List of Illustrations (7)
- Foreword (11)
- I A Young Lady from Baltimore (12)
- II Navy Wife (22)
- III The Little Prince (29)
- IV Prince of Wales (40)
- V Divorce and Re-marriage (49)
- VI Ich Dien (58)
- VII Mrs Simpson meets the Prince (68)
- VIII The Prince in Love (74)
- IX Loved by a King (85)
- X Storm Clouds (96)
- XI Abdication (104)
- XII King into Duke (115)
- XIII Marriage (125)
- XIV The First Two Years (140)
- XV War (150)
- XVI The Bahamas (163)
- XVII The Windsors in France (169)
- XVIII The Brilliant Duchess (188)
- XIX Old Age (198)
- XX Summing Up (211)

Index (220)
