= Anne de Courcy =

English biographer and journalist (born 1927)

Anne Grey de Courcy (née Barrett; born December 1927) is an English biographer and journalist, including as women's editor on the London Evening News, as a columnist for the London Evening Standard and as a feature writer for the Daily Mail.

== Early life and education ==
Anne Grey Barrett was born in December 1927, daughter of Major John Lionel Mackenzie Barrett (d. 1940), of The Tallat, Northleach, Gloucestershire, an officer in the 13th/18th Royal Hussars, and Evelyn Kathleen Frances (1898–1987), daughter of Thomas Stewart Porter, of Clogher Park, County Tyrone (he took his mother's family name, Porter, instead of his father's, Ellison-Macartney, as an heir of the Porter family of Belle Isle, County Longford) Her mother was a descendant of Sir Alan Bellingham, 3rd Baronet. A brother, Christopher, was born in 1930. She was educated at Wroxall Abbey, in Warwickshire.

== Career ==
De Courcy worked for the London Evening News as women's editor in the 1970s. In 1980, de Courcy joined the London Evening Standard as a columnist. Between 1982 and 2003, she was a feature writer for the Daily Mail.

Since 1969, she has produced a number of books, including biographies and social histories. Her stories usually cover women's heroism through historical events (Debs at War, 1939: The Last Season, The Fishing Fleet).

== Personal life ==
In 1951, she married Michael Charles Cameron Claremont Constantine de Courcy, a journalist and RAF officer, half-brother of John de Courcy, 35th Baron Kingsale. He was killed in a flying accident in 1953, aged 22. She then married, in 1959, barrister Robert Armitage (1921–1998), from a family of landed gentry originally of Milnsbridge House, Huddersfield. Milnsbridge House has been in industrial use for at least a century, and the whole surrounding area is industrial.

Anne de Courcy and Robert Armitage had three children.

== Bibliography ==
- Kitchens (1969)
- Plan your Home: Starting from Scratch (1970)
- Making Room at the Top (1974)
- A Guide to Modern Manners (1985)
- 1939: The Last Season (1989)
- Circe: The Life of Edith, Marchioness of Londonderry (1992)
- The Viceroy's Daughters: The Lives of the Curzon Sisters (2000) - Irene, Cynthia and Alexandra
- Diana Mosley (2003)
- Debs at War 1939–1945 (2005)
- Snowdon: The Biography (2008)
- The Fishing Fleet: Husband-Hunting in the Raj (2012)
- Margot at War: Love and Betrayal in Downing Street 1912–1916 (2014)
- The Husband Hunters: Social Climbing in London and New York (2017)
- Chanel's Riviera: Life, Love and the Struggle for Survival on the Côte d'Azur, 1930–1944 (2019)
- Five Love Affairs and a Friendship – The Paris Life of Nancy Cunard, Icon of the Jazz Age (2022)
