= Audrey Russell =

British radio commentator and war correspondent (1906–1989)

Audrey Russel MVO
- Born: 29 June 1906; Dublin, Ireland
- Died: 8 August 1989 (aged 83); Woking, Surrey, England

Muriel Audrey Russell, MVO (29 June 1906 – 8 August 1989) was a BBC Radio journalist (then called a "commentator"), the BBC's first female news reporter, and, in 1944, the first accredited female war reporter.

Russell was born in Dublin on 29 June 1906, to Muriel (née Metcalfe) and John Strangman Russell. Her father was director of his family's woollen mill. She was their only child. Her maternal uncle was E. Dudley "Fruity" Metcalfe, a close friend of Edward, Prince of Wales (later Edward VIII).

She was home-educated governesses, before attending a private boarding-school called Southlands, at Harrow. She then went to a finishing school at the Villa St Georges, Neuilly, Paris.

After training at the Central School of Speech and Drama, she became an actress (her stage debut was at the Lyric in London in 1937) and stage manager, and joined the BBC in 1942 after being discovered by them when interviewed about her wartime work for the National Fire Service.

She travelled to mainland Europe just after the D-Day landings and reported from Belgium, the Netherlands, Germany, and Norway, before returning on health grounds in March 1945.

In 1953, Russell gave a live commentary on the Coronation of Elizabeth II, from inside Westminster Abbey. She also gave commentary on the funeral of Sir Winston Churchill in 1965.

She appeared as a castaway on the BBC Radio programme Desert Island Discs on 29 July 1957. In 1967, she was granted the freedom of the City of London, and was appointed a Member of the Royal Victorian Order (MVO) in the 1976 Birthday Honours. Her autobiography, A Certain Voice, was published in 1984. She died of Alzheimer's disease in Woking, Surrey, on 8 August 1989. An obituary, calling here the "grande dame of radio's vintage years", was published in The Times.

Her World War II military uniform (though non-combatants, war correspondents held military rank) is in the collection of the Imperial War Museum.

== Bibliography ==
- Russell, Audrey (1984). A Certain Voice. Ross Anderson Publications. ISBN 0-86360-017-4.
