= Loved Ones (book) =

1985 book by Diana Mosley

- Cover of Loved Ones
- Author: Diana Mosley
- Language: English
- Genre: Memoirs
- Publisher: Sidgwick & Jackson
- Publication date: 1985
- Publication place: United Kingdom
- Media type: Print (Hardback & Paperback)
- Pages: 224
- Preceded by: The Duchess of Windsor
- Followed by: The Mitfords: Letters Between Six Sisters

Loved Ones is a 1985 collection of pen portraits by Diana Mosley. It was published by Sidgwick & Jackson. In 2008, three of the portraits were republished in the collection, The Pursuit of Laughter.

== Synopsis ==
The book includes pen portraits of leading figures that featured prominently in Mosley's life. These include Lytton Strachey and Dora Carrington, former neighbours and friends of hers. Violet Hammersley, an author, close friend of her mother's and prominent figure in childhood. The writer, Evelyn Waugh a friend. Professor Derek Jackson, a leading physicist and her former brother-in-law. Lord Berners, a friend she stayed with often at Faringdon House. Prince and Princess Clary, friends of hers after the Second World War. The final portrait is of her second husband, Sir Oswald Mosley. The book also features several photographs of the selected subjects.

== Reception ==
The collection was favourably reviewed by The Glasgow Herald, describing Mosley as ″consistently witty in a generous way that indulges neither in sarcasm nor bitterness and her book contains gems of ever-so-English understatement and Mitfordese snobbery.″

== Cover illustration ==
This illustration features a detail from Henry Lamb's portrait of Mosley, painted in 1932 when she was still married to Bryan Guinness.
