= A Life of Contrasts =

1977 autobiography of Diana Mosley

- First edition (US)
- Author: Diana Mosley
- Language: English
- Genre: Autobiography
- Publisher: (UK) Hamish Hamilton, (US) Times Books
- Publication date: 1977 and 2002
- Publication place: United Kingdom
- Media type: Print (Hardback & Paperback)
- Pages: 296
- ISBN: 1-903933-20-X
- OCLC: 59464623
- Followed by: The Duchess of Windsor

A Life of Contrasts is the autobiography of Diana Mosley, one of the Mitford sisters, that was first published in 1977. In 2002, she released a revised edition of the book. Subtitles vary between UK and US editions, and the cover and title page.

== Synopsis ==
In the autobiography, Mosley recounts her colourful past, including her marriage to Oswald Mosley, founder of the British Union of Fascists, her association with Nazi figures and her subsequent three-year internment under Defence Regulation 18B. She also recounts her friendships with leading literary figures Evelyn Waugh, Harold Acton, John Betjeman and Lytton Strachey.

=== 2002 edition ===
In the revised 2002 edition, Mosley describes several events which occurred following the original 1977 publication, such as the grief she experienced after her husband's death, her brain tumour as well as her reaction to international events and public figures. She also writes about her "secret" missions to Germany before war broke out, when she helped set up a radio station to raise funds for the BUF.

== Critical reception ==
The book was generally well received by critics, who were impressed by Mosley's writing talents, although some were not satisfied that she gave a convincing explanation of her controversial political views. This view has been mirrored by Mosley's biographer Jan Dalley and The New York Times critic, Janet Maslin.

Laura Thompson appeared on BBC Radio 4's A Good Read to discuss the book and retold her experience in a column published by The Independent. According to Thompson it was "intensely fascinating to read the life of such a woman, especially when it was so well written." In contrast, the host of the show, Rosie Boycott said that "however charming it might be, it was also a repellent book."

== Contents ==
The book also includes a selection of black and white photographs.

(original edition)

- 1. Grandfathers and Grandmother (1)
- 2. "...She Can't Live Long" (6)
- 3. Batsford (12)
- 4. Asthall (22)
- 5. Paris (44)
- 6. Swinbrook (55)
- 7. Bailiffscourt (61)
- 8. Buckingham Street (70)
- 9. Cheyne Walk (86)
- 10. Mosley (94)
- 11. Munich and Rome (106)
- 12. Hitler (116)
- 13. Accident (129)
- 14. Wooton (136)
- 15. Berlin (147)
- 16. War (157)
- 17. Prison (169)
- 18. Crux Easton (199)
- 19. Crowood (210)
- 20. ALIANORA (218)
- 21. Le Temple De La Gloire (230)
- 22. Clonfert (235)
- 23. Venice and Paris (244)
- 24. Inch Kenneth and London (254)
- 25. The Windsors (264)
- 26. The Antagonists (268)
- 27. A Vale of Tears (273)
- 28. Laughter and the Love of Friends (282)

Index (289)
