= Kohora =

- Town
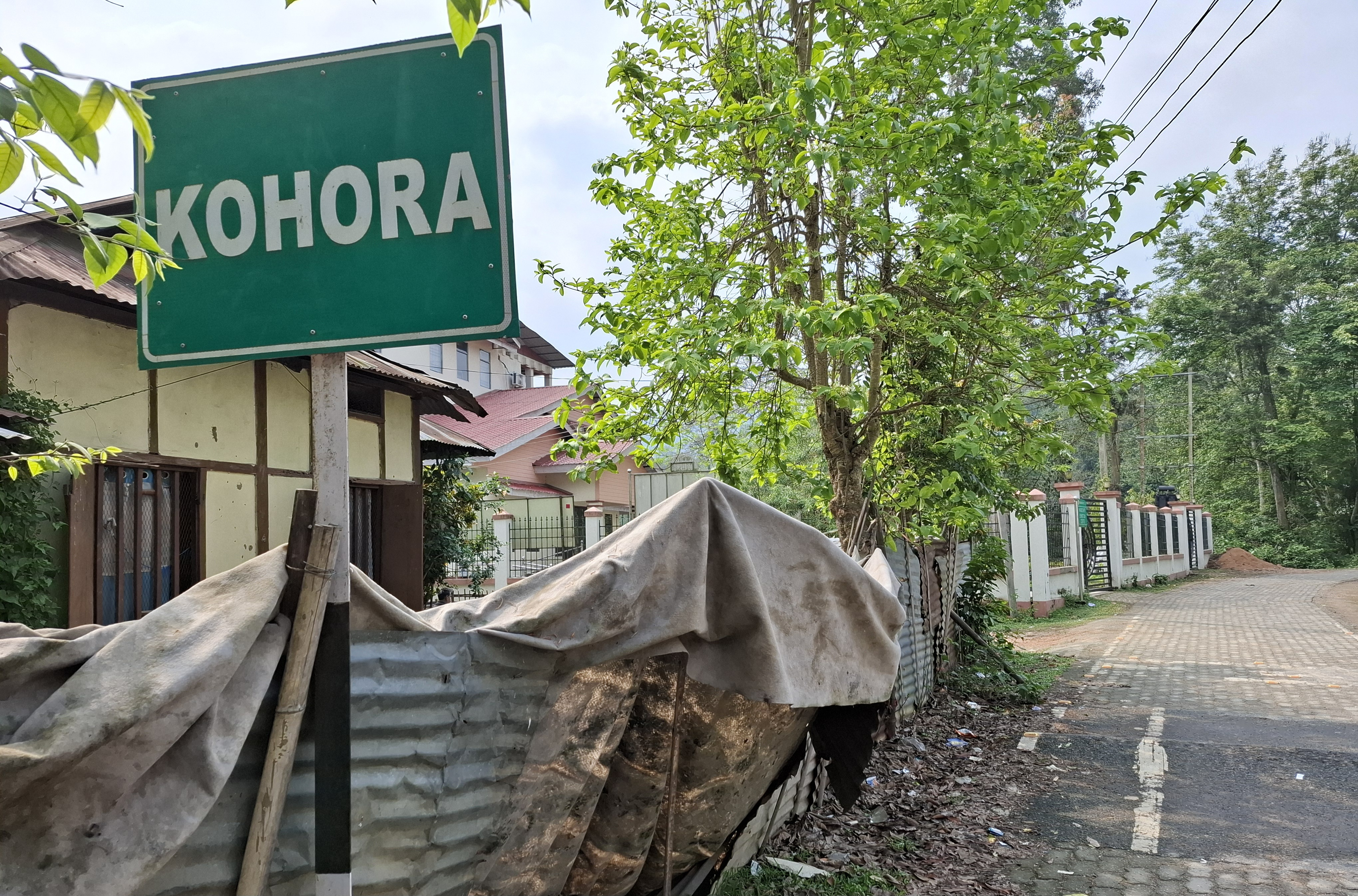
- Kohora village

- Location in Assam, India Kohora (India)
- Coordinates: 26.63°N 93.6°E
- Country: India
- State: Assam
- District: Golaghat
- Elevation: 76 m (249 ft)

Languages
  - Official: Assamese
- Time zone: UTC+5:30 (IST)
- PIN: 785 609
- Telephone code: (91)3776
- Vehicle registration: AS 05

Kohora is a small town situated in the Golaghat district of Assam. It is the main entrance of the world-famous Kaziranga National Park. It lies on the National Highway 37(Asean Highway 1). Kohora lies between Nagaon and Golaghat.

== Climate ==
The climate of Kohora is same with the world heritage site Kaziranga National Park which experiences three seasons: summer, monsoon, and winter. The winter season, between November and February, is mild and dry, with a mean high of 25 °C (77 °F) and low of 5 °C (41 °F). During this season, beels and nullahs (water channels) dry up. The summer season between March and May is hot, with temperatures reaching a high of 37 °C (99 °F). During this season, animals usually are found near water bodies. The rainy monsoon season lasts from June to September, and is responsible for most of Kaziranga's average annual rainfall of 2,220 mm (87 in). During the peak monsoon months of July and August, three-fourths of the western region of the town is submerged, due to the rising water level of the Brahmaputra. The flooding causes, at the north side of the town, most animals to migrate to elevated and forested regions outside the southern border of the national park, such as the Mikir hills. A total of 540 animals, including 13 rhinos and mostly hog deer perished in unprecedented devastating floods of 2012. Occasional dry spells also create problems, such as food shortages for the wildlife in the park.

== Tourist Complex ==
Kohora is the main entrance to the world heritage site Kaziranga, so that there are many resorts, hotels and guesthouses for tourists. The all tourist facilities are available at an areal distance which is known as Kaziranga Tourist Complex or similarly Kohora Tourist Complex. It covers a distance of minimum 10 kilometers along the National Highway 37 and about 1 kilometer to the south of the town (central).

== Schools ==
Name of the school	Established	Location
Kaziranga National Park High School	N/A	Central Kohora
Rising Sun English School	N/A	South Kohora
Kohora Medium English School	N/A	Central Kohora
Sankardev Sishu Vidya Niketan	2002	Pilkhana, Kohora
Kaziranga High School	N/A	Diring, East of Kohora
Little Flower School	N/A	Bagori, West of Kohora
Mahaveer Dharohar Goswami Vidya Mandir	1997	Bagori, West of Kohora

== Colleges ==
Name of the college	Established	Location	Stream(s)	Official Website
Government Model College, Kaziranga	2020	Diring, East of Kohora	Arts/ Humanities	https://www.gmck.ac.in/

== Road ==
Kohora is connected with National Highway 37 therefore it connects with all the major cities of Assam (Guwahati, Jorhat, Nagaon, Tezpur, Sivasagar, Dibrugarh). There are several bus stoppage nearby the highway.

== Transport ==
Due to its location near the National Highway 37 bus service and local transportation is available at Kohora. Minibus service connects Jorhat, Tezpur, Nagaon, Golaghat. And Super buses connects Guwahati, Jorhat, Nagaon, Sivasagar, Digboi, Tinisukia, Doomdooma, Jagun, Imphal (NH39), Golaghat (NH39), Dimapur (NH39). Local transport service connects Bokakhat and Kohora.

== Postal service ==
- Kaziranga National Park Post Office, Near BSNL, Kohora
