= Irene Curzon, 2nd Baroness Ravensdale =

British hereditary peeress (1896-1966)

The Right Honourable The Baroness Ravensdale CBE

Member of the House of Lords
- Lord Temporal
- In office 10 October 1958 – 9 February 1966 as a life peer
- In office 19 November 1963 – 9 February 1966 as a hereditary peer (Note: Pursuant to the Peerage Act 1963.)
- Preceded by: The 1st Marquess Curzon of Kedleston (as 1st Baron Ravensdale)
- Succeeded by: The 3rd Baron Ravensdale

Personal details
- Born: Mary Irene Curzon; 20 January 1896 London, England
- Died: 9 February 1966 (aged 70)
- Party: Crossbench
- Parent(s): George Curzon, 1st Marquess Curzon of Kedleston; Mary Leiter
- Relatives: Lady Cynthia Mosley (sister); Lady Alexandra Metcalfe (sister)

Mary Irene Curzon, 2nd Baroness Ravensdale, Baroness Ravensdale of Kedleston (20 January 1896 – 9 February 1966), was a British peeress, socialite and philanthropist.

== Background ==
Irene was born at 4 Carlton House Gardens, St James's, the eldest child of George Curzon, 1st Marquess Curzon of Kedleston, and Mary Victoria Leiter, daughter of Levi Leiter. She inherited her father's Barony of Ravensdale, County Derby, in the Peerage of the United Kingdom, on 20 March 1925, and was created a life peer as Baroness Ravensdale of Kedleston, of Kedleston, in the County of Derby, on 10 October 1958. This allowed her to sit in the House of Lords prior to the passing of the Peerage Act 1963, which allowed suo jure hereditary peeresses to enter. She and her two younger sisters were memorialised by Anne de Courcy in The Viceroy's Daughters: the Lives of the Curzon Sisters.

== Royal links ==
Irene Curzon had an intimate insight into the life of the Duke of Windsor, his friendship and marriage to Wallis Simpson and the life of the House of Windsor, through her sister, Alexandra, and her brother-in-law, Major Edward Dudley Metcalfe, best friend of Edward VIII. She saw the rise of British fascism through her sister Lady Cynthia Mosley and her other brother-in-law Sir Oswald Mosley, with whom she had a brief fling prior to their marriage.

== Personal life ==
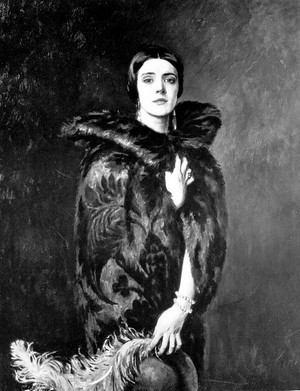
Mary Irene Curzon, Baroness Ravensdale, William Bruce Ellis Ranken, 1925.

Irene's father was the successful diplomat-politician George Curzon. After he was appointed Viceroy of India in 1898, she went out with her mother and sisters to live in New Delhi. Shortly after they returned to England, Lord Curzon resigned in 1905, at the end of a long period of Conservative government. Created Earl of Kedleston and Baron Ravensdale in 1911, the titles were in reversion to daughters as well as heirs male.

Irene was a "tall and stately beauty" according to her friend Charlotte Greenwood. She was intensely musical and passionate about hunting, bridge and parties. She had numerous love affairs within the elite Melton Mowbray hunting clique and had a long relationship with the renowned pianist Arthur Rubinstein, whom she said she slept with on his wedding day. During the Great War she went to a club in the East End of London to sing to the working men and women as part of a voluntary job. And in the last year of the war she went to the gender-specific YMCA to take care of the poor and dispossessed in France.

Both Victor Cazalet and Nevile Henderson proposed to her. She was briefly engaged to Miles Graham on the rebound from a long entanglement with Gordon Leith, but never married or had children. She became a guardian to her sister Cynthia’s three children with Oswald Mosley following Cynthia’s death. She was particularly attached to Michael who was a small child when his mother died. She worried that she and her money might be seen primarily as useful accompaniments to a political career and yearned to marry a man who would refuse to leave his wife.

Despite her active social life, she maintained a strong dedication towards welfare work. She was appointed the chair of Highways Clubs Inc. in 1936 which provided music, handicrafts and physical training to young disadvantaged people. She was also appointed vice-president of the National Association of the Girls Clubs and Mixed Clubs. And then she was the obvious candidate to be the president of the London Union of Youth Clubs.

A confirmed Anglican, she was most tolerant of other religions. Her friend, the Asian explorer Sir Francis Younghusband, considered by parliament one of the heroes of the age, helped her form the World Congress of Faiths. It was an ecumenical organisation that aimed to bring all faiths together in a spirit of unity and co-operation. She was chairman from 1942 and in the 1960s became founder president. Most especially she warmed to the caring, compassion of Buddhist gurus for their spiritualism and "priceless truths". In a world of the "unhappy distractions of materialism", she wrote in 1936, "people needed a spiritual design for living in a greater universalism." She said in her peroration "... all the prejudices against women ... are unjustifiable."

== Later life and House of Lords ==
During World War II she was based at the Dorchester Hotel, nicknamed 'the Dorch', her days spent nursing wounded soldiers, working in canteens, lecturing and doing other war work. Curzon was made the fourth female life peer for her work with youth clubs. Her youngest sister, Alexandra, was also recognised, being made a CBE for her tireless efforts on behalf of Save the Children Fund.

In later years she demonstrated how she had worked hard all her career to campaign for others, for charity and to get women into the House of Lords. On 22 October 1958 she was created one of the first four life peeresses and introduced to the Lords.

She sat on the Cross bench when she made a maiden speech on 4 February 1959, in which she discussed funding youth services. She called on the government to take grant aid seriously to fund a voluntary sector that was understaffed. In the Charity Commissioners Act 1959, the Macmillan Government conducted a major overhaul of the sector.

Speaking on the Street Offences Bill 1959 she criticised the law, which blamed women for seeking income from prostitution, and sought, instead, to punish the men. She accused the government of permitting the burgeoning club scene in London, particularly to thrive, off criminal gangs, pimps and ponces. Her clever use of humour and language interspersed with Tory shock tactics impressed her fellow peers.

In celebrating youth services, the baroness affirmed the Albemarle Report; finding a need for 'professionalised' recruitment was not the answer to a million youngsters by 1962, by moral and ethical principles. Lady Ravensdale died in 1966. She was succeeded in her hereditary peerage by her nephew, writer and biographer Nicholas Mosley, son of her sister Lady Cynthia Mosley and Sir Oswald Mosley.

The Baroness Ravensdale of Kedleston
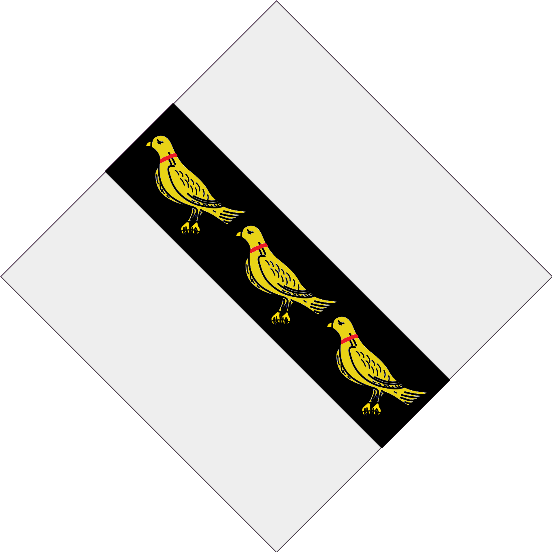
- Shield: Argent on a bend Sable three popinjays Or collared Gules.

== Publications ==
- In Many Rhythms: An Autobiography, (London, 1953)

== Notes ==
Peerage of the United Kingdom
Preceded by George Curzon	Baroness Ravensdale; 1925–1966; Member of the House of Lords (1958–1966)	Succeeded by Nicholas Mosley
