= Stephan Grothgar =

German actor

Stephan "Groda" Grothgar, sometimes credited as Stefen Grothgar, is a German film, television, and voice actor. He is a native of Hamburg.

Grothgar has appeared in the British television series Redcap and The Bill, and had a minor part in the film Saving Private Ryan. He has provided voices for the video games Metal Gear Solid, Sniper Elite, Richard Burns Rally, Worms 3D, and Fallout 2.
