= Lady Alexandra Metcalfe =

British aristocrat (1904–1995)

Lady Alexandra Metcalfe CBE
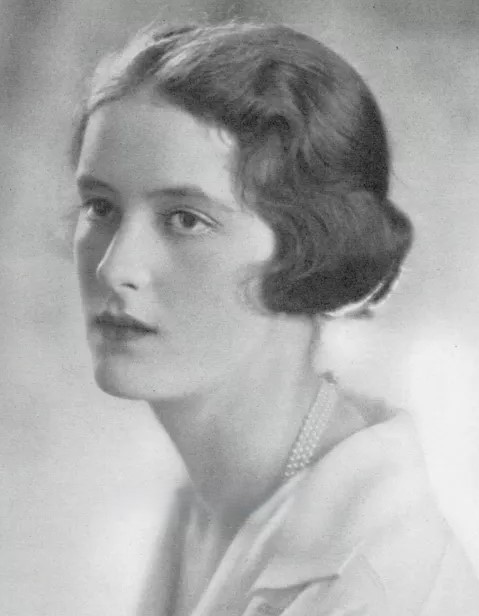
- Born: Alexandra Naldera Curzon; 20 March 1904; London, England
- Died: 7 August 1995 (aged 91); Oxford, Oxfordshire, England
- Spouse: Edward Dudley Metcalfe (m. 1925; div. 1955)
- Children: 3
- Parents: George Curzon, 1st Marquess Curzon of Kedleston; Mary Leiter
- Relatives: Irene Curzon, 2nd Baroness Ravensdale (sister); Lady Cynthia Mosley (sister)

Lady Alexandra Naldera Metcalfe CBE (née Curzon; 20 March 1904 – 7 August 1995) was a British aristocrat. She was the third daughter of Lord Curzon, Viceroy of India, and his first wife, the American heiress, Mary Victoria Leiter.

== Early life ==
Lady Alexandra Curzon was born in March 1904 in London. She was named after her godmother, Queen Alexandra and her place of conception, Naldehra, near Simla. Her mother died in 1906 when Alexandra was only two years old. Her father's Indian servants called her "Baba Sahib", "Baby Master", and she was thereafter best known as "Baba". She and her sisters, Irene ("Nina") and Cynthia ("Cimmie") were brought up at Hackwood Park, Hampshire, and Montacute; their London home, 1 Carlton Gardens in Carlton House Terrace, became a centre of elite social life after Curzon's second marriage to Grace Elvina Duggan in 1917. She was dubbed the "prettiest debutante of the 1922 season".

== Adulthood ==
She was the first love of Prince George, Duke of Kent. However, on 21 July 1925 she married Major Edward Dudley Metcalfe, ADC and equerry of Edward VIII. She was one of a handful of witnesses to Edward's marriage to Wallis Simpson.

The Metcalfes had a son, David (1927–2012), who was a noted socialite.

Before World War II she earned the sobriquet Baba Blackshirt, and for a while played a murky role as a semiwitting go-between for her brother-in-law Sir Oswald Mosley and Dino Grandi, Benito Mussolini's ambassador to London, while simultaneously enjoying the romantic devotion of the foreign secretary, Lord Halifax, who was staying at the same Dorchester Hotel as Alexandra and her sister.

The Metcalfes divorced in 1955 but remained close, with Alexandra reportedly resenting any "denigration of her former husband."

== Later life ==
The main thrust of Baba's later life was her tireless efforts for the Save the Children Fund, a commitment that lasted for more than 40 years. Lady Alexandra joined the Save the Children Fund in 1950 and was very active in fund-raising in London. In 1955, she and her husband divorced and she became a member of the fund's governing council. Later she would become chairman of the Overseas Relief and Welfare Committee, which controls all overseas work of the fund. In 1974 she was elected vice-president.

=== Honours ===
She was appointed Commander of the Order of the British Empire for those efforts in 1975.

=== Death ===
She died on 7 August 1995 at age 91 at John Radcliffe Hospital, Oxford. She was the last surviving witness to the wedding of the Duke and Duchess of Windsor.

== In popular culture ==
Alexandra was portrayed by Caroline Simmons in the 1980 seven-episode television mini-series, Edward and Mrs. Simpson, which won the 1980 Emmy Award for Outstanding Limited Series.

She was portrayed by Flora Montgomery in the four-episode Channel Four (UK) television drama mini-series Mosley in 1998. It was based on the books Rules of the Game and Beyond the Pale by her nephew Nicholas Mosley, Mosley's son.

She was portrayed by Rebecca Saire in season 2 of The Crown, in the episode "Vergangenheit".

She and her two older sisters were the subjects of a biography by Anne de Courcy in The Viceroy's Daughters: The Lives of the Curzon Sisters.

== Bibliography ==
- Bradford, Sarah (9 August 1995). "Short Biography". The Independent.
