= Lady Cynthia Mosley =

British politician (1898–1933)

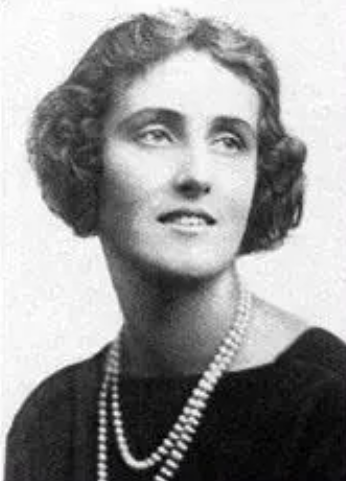
- Lady Cynthia Mosley

Member of Parliament for Stoke-on-Trent
- In office 30 May 1929 – 27 October 1931
- Preceded by: John Ward
- Succeeded by: Ida Copeland

Personal details
- Born: Cynthia Blanche Curzon; 23 August 1898 Kedleston, Derbyshire, England
- Died: 16 May 1933 (aged 34) London, England
- Party: Labour Party (1924–1931); New Party (1931–1932)
- Spouse: Oswald Mosley (m. 1920)
- Children: 3, including Nicholas Mosley, 3rd Baron Ravensdale
- Parents: George Curzon, 1st Marquess Curzon of Kedleston; Mary Leiter
- Relatives: Irene Curzon, 2nd Baroness Ravensdale (sister); Lady Alexandra Curzon (sister)

Lady Cynthia Blanche Mosley (Note: See also Courtesy titles in the United Kingdom. As the wife of a baronet she was occasionally seen in records as Lady Mosley; however by preference always referred to as Lady Cynthia (when used in public with a surname, Curzon/Mosley), her own title as the daughter of a marquess.) (née Curzon; 23 August 1898 – 16 May 1933) was a British aristocrat, politician and the first wife of the British Fascist politician Sir Oswald Mosley.

== Early life ==
Born Cynthia Blanche Curzon at Kedleston Hall, she was the second daughter of Hon. George Curzon (later Marquess Curzon of Kedleston) and his first wife, Mary Victoria Leiter, an American department-store heiress. As the daughter of an Earl (and later a Marquess), she was styled Lady Cynthia from 1911. She was nicknamed "Cimmie".

== Marriage and family ==
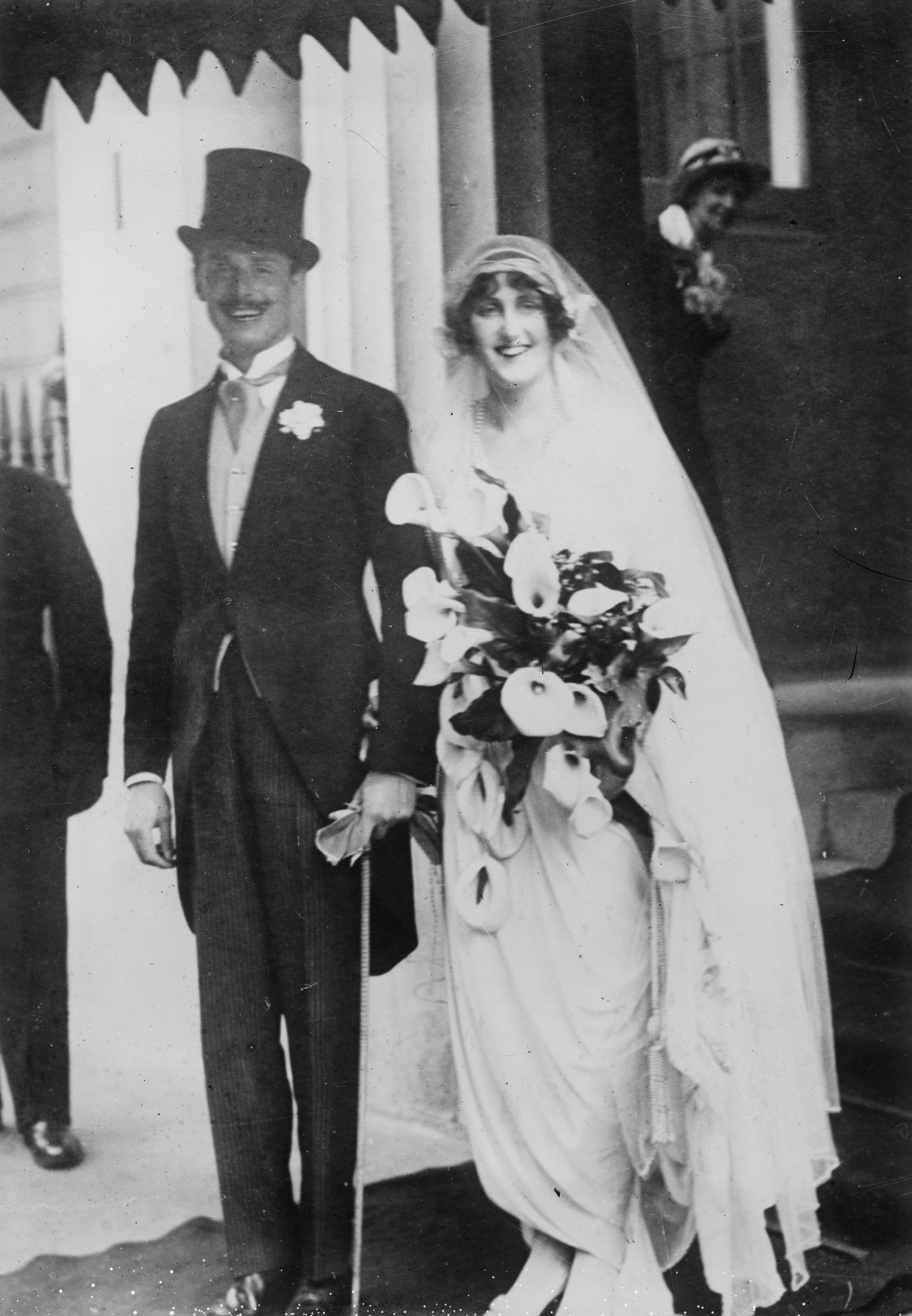
Oswald and Cynthia Mosley on their wedding day, 11 May 1920

On 11 May 1920, Cynthia married the then-Conservative politician, Oswald Mosley. He was her first and only lover.

They had three children:

- Vivien Elizabeth Mosley (25 February 1921 – 26 August 2002), (Note: b. 25 February 1921, d. 25 August 2002, aged 81. m. St Martin-in-the-Fields, London, January 1949, Desmond Francis Forbes Adam, the son of Colin Forbes Adam, of Skipwith Hall, Selby, Chairman of Yorkshire Post Newspapers, by his wife, the former Hon. Irene Constance Lawley, daughter of the 3rd Lord Wenlock. Vivien's father, Sir Oswald, gave her in marriage at the ceremony. The couple had a son, Rupert, born in 1957, and two daughters, Cynthia, born in 1950, and Arabella, born in 1952. The marriage ended, 3 January 1958, when her husband was killed instantly in a road accident at Newark. He was 31, travelling from London to a family christening in Yorkshire, when a car, in which he was a passenger, collided with a lorry.) who on 15 January 1949 married Desmond Francis Forbes Adam who was killed in a car crash in 1958.
- Nicholas Mosley, 3rd Baron Ravensdale (25 June 1923 – 28 February 2017), a successful novelist who wrote a biography of his father and edited his memoirs for publication;
- Michael Mosley (25 April 1932 – 13 March 2012), died unmarried and without issue.

== Political life ==
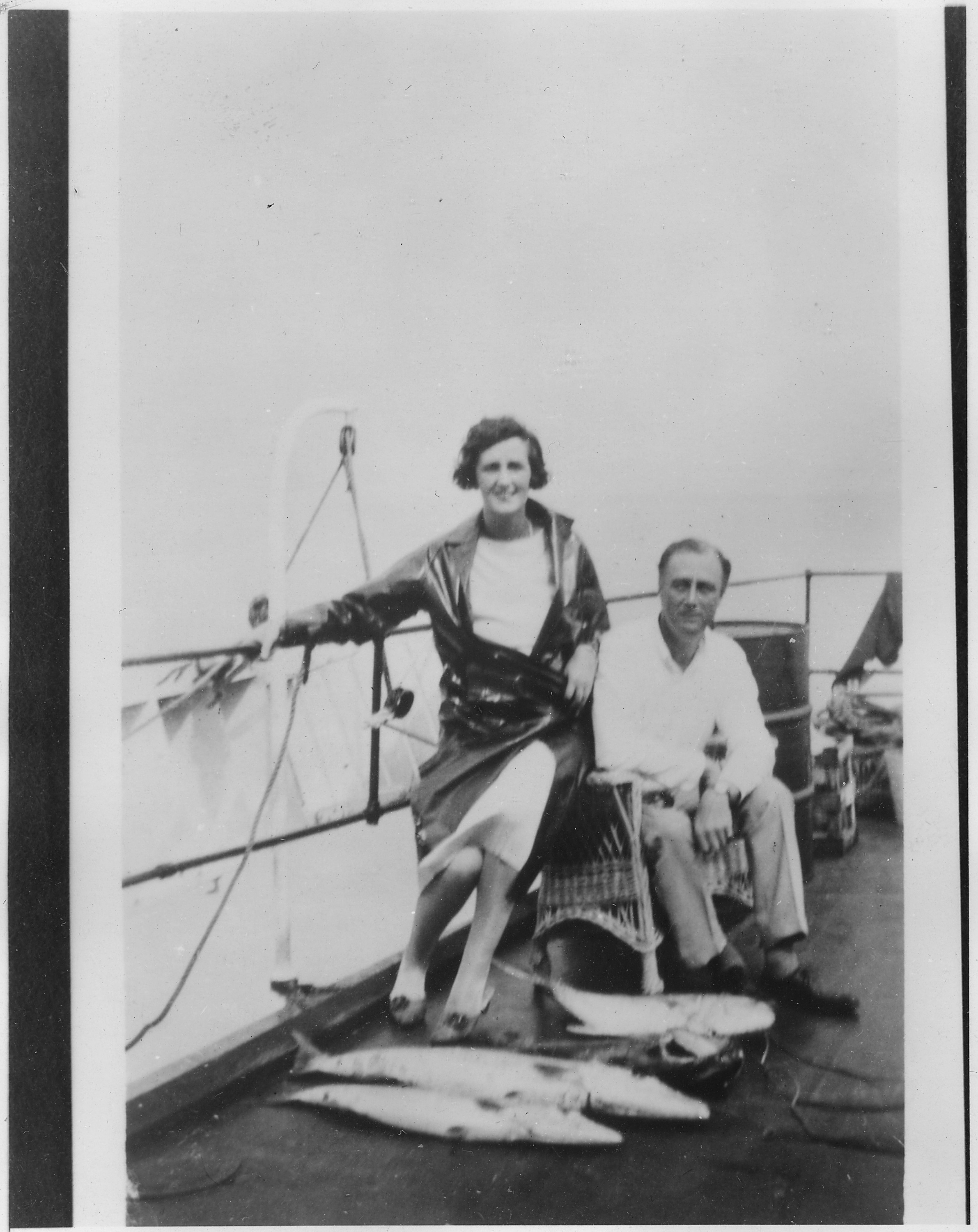
Mosley with Franklin D. Roosevelt in 1926

Both Cynthia and Oswald Mosley joined the Labour Party in 1924. She was elected Labour Member of Parliament (MP) for Stoke-on-Trent in the 1929 general election, her husband having been elected MP for Smethwick in 1926. Frustrated with the ruling Labour Party's complacent and conservative response to high levels of unemployment, Oswald Mosley formed the New Party on 1 March 1931 which his wife also joined. The party failed to win any seats at the 1931 general election. After that Mosley started his move towards Fascism, losing many of those who had joined the New Party as a result.

In September 1930, Lady Cynthia, after flying to Istanbul, sent a letter to the exiled Russian revolutionary, Leon Trotsky, whom she admired. As Labour MP for Stoke, Lady Cynthia had failed to get the British Labour government to offer Trotsky political asylum in Britain. Lady Cynthia's letter read:

"Istanbul, 4th September, 1930

Dear Comrade Trotsky,

I would like above all things to see you for a few moments. There is no good reason why you should see me as (1) I belong to the Labour Party in England who were so ridiculous and refused to allow you in, but also I belong to the ILP and we did our very best to make them change their minds, and (2) I am daughter of Lord Curzon who was Minister for Foreign Affairs in London when you were in Russia! On the other hand I am an ardent Socialist. I am a member of the House of Commons. I think less than nothing of the present Government. I have just finished reading your life which inspired me as no other book has done for ages. I am a great admirer of yours. These days when great men seem so very few and far between it would be a great privilege to meet one of the enduring figures of our age and I do hope with all my heart you will grant me that privilege. I need hardly say I come as a private person, not a journalist or anything but myself—I am on my way to Russia, I leave for Batum-Tiflis-Rostov-Kharkov and Moscow by boat Monday. I have come to Prinkipo this afternoon especially to try to see you, but if it were not convenient I could come out again any day till Monday. I do hope however you could allow me a few moments this afternoon.

Yours fraternally,

Cynthia Mosley."

Trotsky agreed to meet Lady Cynthia, but became suspicious when Lady Cynthia said that her husband also admired him. While Oswald Mosley was still Labour MP for Smethwick and attacking Ramsay MacDonald from the left at the time, along with being seemingly the finest left-wing mind on the Labour government front bench, Trotsky was already suspicious of Oswald's impatience and ambition, labelling him as the "aristocratic coxcomb". Trotsky was also critical of Lady Cynthia for the female companion she brought with her to the meeting. In 1935, Trotsky recalled his meeting with Lady Cynthia, expressing no surprise in her husband Oswald's subsequent journey to the far-right and becoming the British leader of fascism, with Trotsky also questioning what became of Lady Cynthia personally and politically before "her sudden death" in 1933.

== Husband's adultery ==
During their marriage, Lady Cynthia's younger sister, Lady Alexandra, was a mistress of Oswald Mosley, as was, briefly, their stepmother, Grace Curzon, Marchioness Curzon of Kedleston.

== Electoral defeat and death ==
All the New Party's candidates in the 1931 election lost their seats or failed to win in constituencies, instead seeing a National Government which involved the Conservatives, Liberals and a breakaway from the main Labour Party amid the Great Depression. Cynthia Mosley did not stand in the election; Oswald contested her old seat of Stoke. She drifted away from her husband politically, having no sympathy for his move towards fascism. She died in London in 1933 at 34 after an operation for peritonitis following acute appendicitis.

== Styles ==
- 23 August – 20 October 1898: Miss Cynthia Blanche Curzon
- 20 October 1898 – 2 November 1911: The Hon. Cynthia Blanche Curzon
- 2 November 1911 – 11 May 1920: Lady Cynthia Blanche Curzon
- 1920 – 30 May 1929: Lady Cynthia Blanche Mosley
- 30 May 1929 – 27 October 1931: Lady Cynthia Blanche Mosley MP
- 27 October 1931 – 16 May 1933: Lady Cynthia Blanche Mosley

== Sources ==
- De Courcy, Anne (2003) The Viceroy's Daughters, The Lives of the Curzon Sisters, HarperCollins; ISBN 0-06-093557-X (biography); retrieved 14 March 2007
- Mosley
- Hansard 1803–2005: contributions in Parliament by Lady Cynthia Mosley

== Notes ==
Parliament of the United Kingdom
| Preceded by John Ward | Member of Parliament for Stoke-on-Trent; 1929–1931 | Succeeded by Ida Copeland |
