= Edward Dudley Metcalfe =

British Indian Army officer (1887–1957)

Edward Dudley Metcalfe MVO MC ADC
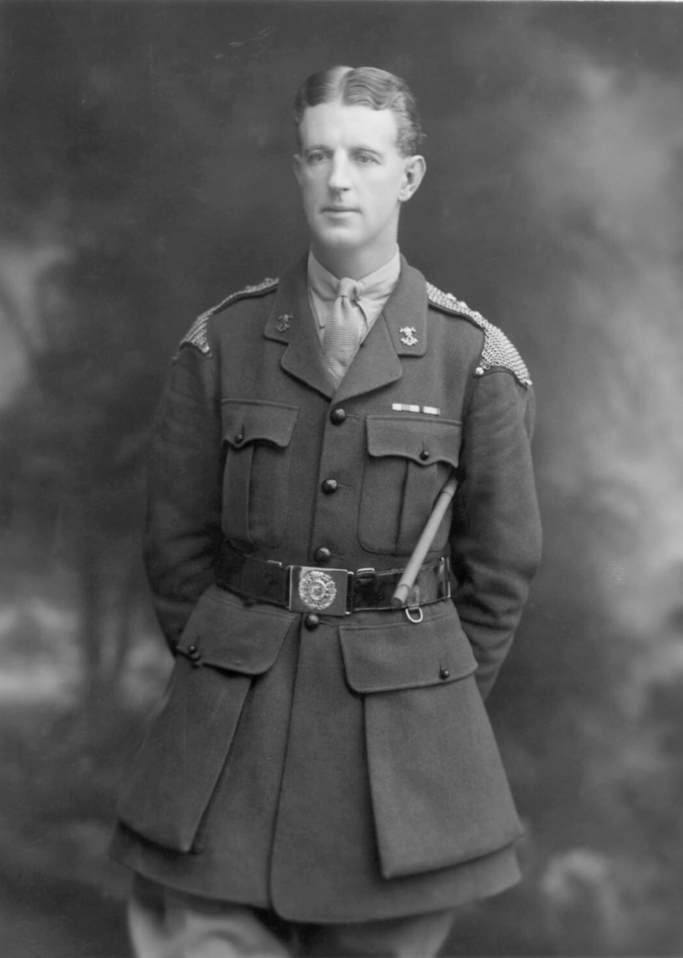
- Metcalfe in 1919

Equerry to the Duke of Windsor
- In office 1939–1943

Personal details
- Born: 16 January 1887 Dublin, Ireland
- Died: 18 November 1957 (aged 70) London, England
- Spouse: Lady Alexandra Curzon (m. 1925; div. 1955)
- Children: 3
- Education: Trinity College, Dublin
- Awards: Military Cross; Royal Victorian Order
- Nickname: Fruity

Military service
- Allegiance: United Kingdom
- Branch/service: Indian Army; Royal Air Force
- Years of service: 1907–1927 (Army); 1940–1942 (RAF)
- Rank: Major (Army); Flying officer (RAF)
- Battles/wars: First World War

Major Edward Dudley Metcalfe, MVO, MC, ADC (16 January 1887 – 18 November 1957) was a British Indian Army officer and a close friend, aide-de-camp and equerry of the Prince of Wales, later King Edward VIII and Duke of Windsor.

== Early life ==
Metcalfe was born in Dublin, Ireland, on 16 January 1887, the only son of Edward Metcalfe and Edith Mary Howard Hamilton. He was educated privately and at Trinity College, Dublin. To friends and family, he was affectionately called "Fruity".

== Career ==
Metcalfe was commissioned on to the Unattached list for Auxiliary Forces (University Candidate) on 27 May 1907. He transferred to the Unattached List, Indian Army on 15 August 1908 but to have seniority from 17 August 1907. He spent a year attached to the 1st battalion Connaught Rangers in India from 8 November 1908 until, on 8 November 1909, being accepted into the Indian Army and joining 3rd Skinner's Horse. He was promoted lieutenant on 17 November 1909.

He attended the 1911 Delhi Durbar with his regiment, and in 1912 attended the Cavalry School at Saugor. On 12 August 1914 he was appointed Adjutant of the Governor's Body Guard, Bombay.

=== World War I ===
With the outbreak of the Great War, Metcalfe's regiment was mobilised and sent to France late in 1914.

Metcalfe was promoted temporary captain on 1 September 1915. He served in France before being sent back to India in June 1916, from where he volunteered to serve with the 7th Meerut Cavalry headquarters which went to Mesopotamia. He was promoted captain 17 August 1916; however this was later antedated to 1 September 1915.

Metcalfe was mentioned in dispatches, reported in the London Gazette on 15 August 1917, and ten days later came notice that he had been awarded the Military Cross for distinguished service in Mesopotamia.

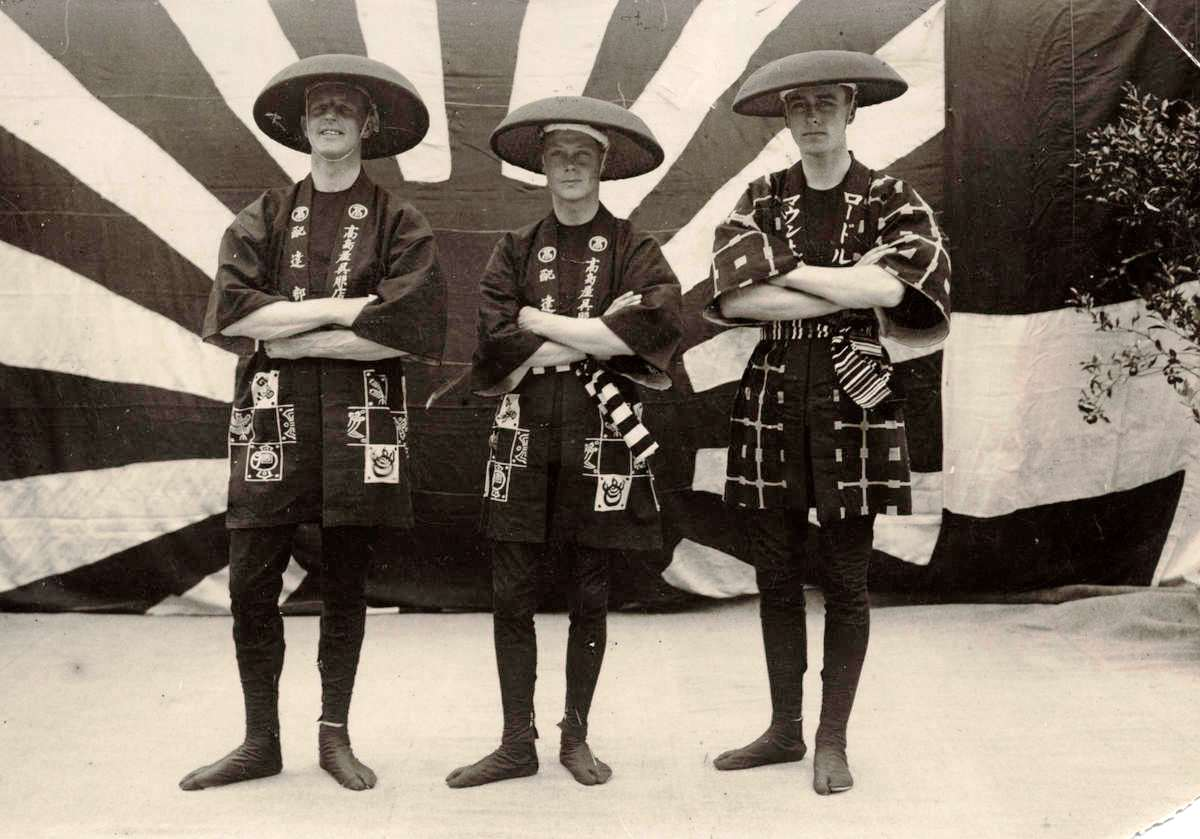
Pictured in local costume in Japan in 1922 (L-R): Metcalfe, Edward, Prince of Wales, and Louis Mountbatten

In 1918, Metcalfe was attached to the Signal Service, where he remained until January 1920, when he was attached to the 27th Light Cavalry. By early 1921, he was back serving with the 3rd Skinner's Horse.

=== Between the wars ===
By July 1921, Metcalfe was serving with the Indian State Forces of Indore. Metcalfe first met the future Edward VIII when, as Prince of Wales, he was touring India in 1922. Edward was impressed with Metcalfe's knowledge of horses and made him a member of his personal staff, appointing him an aide de camp; he subsequently accompanied the prince on his tour of Japan.

In July 1922, in the wake of the Prince's tour, he was appointed a Member of the Royal Victorian Order, 4th class, and in August 1922 was appointed as temporary equerry to the Prince of Wales. Metcalfe was provisionally promoted to the rank of major on 17 August 1922.

He was appointed an extra aide de camp to the Commander-in-Chief in India on 4 September 1926 and retired from the Indian Army on 6 September 1927.

With his wife, he attended meetings of the Oswald Mosley organization in the January Club, and, in May 1934, a dinner at London's Savoy Hotel of the British Fascist Blackshirts, of which he was a member.

After the king abdicated on 11 December 1936 and became the Duke of Windsor, Metcalfe was best man at his wedding in France to Wallis Simpson on 3 June 1937.

=== World War II ===
Metcalfe served as equerry to the Duke of Windsor from 1939 in Paris and Antibes until the German invasion of France in 1940 prompted the Windsors' evacuation and, later, the Duke's appointment to govern the Bahamas. Metcalfe's loyalty was not rewarded by the Duke, who fled Paris in May 1940 following the German invasion, leaving Metcalfe to find his own way home back to England. The Duke was apparently more concerned for the welfare of his terriers than his equerry; at a dinner in Paris in May 1940 Metcalfe unburdened himself to his friend Clare Luce: "The Duke has ordered me to take those bloody cairns [dogs] to La Croë [in the South of France]. I was a soldier! When I resigned from my regiment in India to serve the Prince, it wasn't to be a valet to his God-damned dogs!"

On 10 August 1940, Metcalfe was commissioned as a pilot officer into the Administrative and Special Duties Branch of the Royal Air Force. He was promoted to flying officer on 10 August 1941. He was posted to Cairo in November 1941, returning to Britain at the end of September 1942, but resigned his commission on 17 November 1942.

Metcalfe and his wife, Alexandra, purchased a grand country house, Little Compton Manor, in 1939 near Moreton-in-Marsh, Gloucestershire. There they entertained friends and dignitaries, including the Windsors after the war. Based on proximity to Cheltenham, they befriended the American Maj. Gen. John C. H. Lee in 1942. Lee was Commanding General of the United States Army Services of Supply beginning in May 1942, and centred the vast buildup operations of the U.S. Army in Cheltenham, far enough west in Britain to be out of range of German Luftwaffe bombers. Lee spent many respite weekends at the Manor until the D-Day Invasion in June 1944, and also entertained many military and diplomatic visitors there, recouping from the crushing responsibilities of managing the largest logistical operation in the history of the world.

== Personal life ==
In 1925, Metcalfe married Lady Alexandra Naldera ("Baba") Curzon (1904–1995), 18 years younger than he, and the third daughter of George Curzon, 1st Marquess Curzon of Kedleston, erstwhile Viceroy of India, and Lord Curzon's first wife, the American mercantile heiress Mary Victoria Leiter.

They had a son, David Patrick Metcalfe (1927–2012), and twin daughters Davina and Linda (1930). They divorced in 1955.

Metcalfe lived at South Hartfield House, Coleman's Hatch, in Ashdown Forest, Sussex, about 40 miles (64 km) south of London.

Metcalfe's sister Muriel married John Strangman Russell, director of his family's woollen mill; their daughter was the BBC Radio commentator Audrey Russell.

== In popular culture ==
He was portrayed by Gareth Marks in the second season of the Netflix series The Crown.
