= Mosley baronets of Ancoats (1781) =

British title

Escutcheon of the Mosley baronets of Ancoats

The Mosley baronetcy, of Ancoats, in the County of Lancaster, was created in the Baronetage of Great Britain on 8 June 1781 for John Mosley, a distant relation of the 2nd and 3rd Baronets of the 1720 creation, and adopted by the childless 2nd Baronet. (Note: Sir John Mosley, 1st Baronet, of Ancoats, was adopted by Sir Oswald Mosley, 2nd Baronet (of the 1720 creation; 1705–1757), his childless second cousin and godfather, after his father died in 1734/5.)

His grandson the 2nd Baronet represented North Staffordshire in the House of Commons. The 4th Baronet served as High Sheriff of Staffordshire in 1894.

The family seats were Rolleston Hall, near Rolleston on Dove, Staffordshire, and Ancoats Hall, near Manchester.

== Mosley baronets, of Ancoats (1781) ==
- Sir John Parker Mosley, 1st Baronet (1732–1798)
- Sir Oswald Mosley, 2nd Baronet (1785–1871)
- Sir Tonman Mosley, 3rd Baronet (1813–1890)
- Sir Oswald Mosley, 4th Baronet (1848–1915)
- Sir Oswald Mosley, 5th Baronet (1873–1928)
- Sir Oswald Ernald Mosley, 6th Baronet (1896–1980), founder of the British Union of Fascists.
- Nicholas Mosley, 3rd Baron Ravensdale, 7th Baronet (1923–2017); succeeded his maternal aunt Irene Curzon as Baron Ravensdale in 1966.

For later succession, see Baron Ravensdale.

== Extended family ==
- Tonman Mosley, 1st Baron Anslow, younger son of the 3rd Baronet, was a barrister and judge.
- Max Mosley, second son in the second marriage of the 6th Baronet, was the long-serving President of the Fédération Internationale de l'Automobile.

== Notes ==
Baronetage of Great Britain
Preceded by Sykes baronets	Mosley baronets of Ancoats; 8 June 1781	Succeeded by Quin baronets
