= Oswald Mosley (disambiguation) =

Sir Oswald Mosley, 6th Baronet, of Ancoats (1896–1980) was a British baronet, politician, and fascist activist.

Oswald Mosley may also refer to:

- Sir Oswald Mosley, 1st Baronet, of Rolleston (1674–1751)
- Sir Oswald Mosley, 2nd Baronet, of Rolleston (1705–1757)
- Sir Oswald Mosley, 2nd Baronet, of Ancoats (1785–1871), British baronet and politician
- Sir Oswald Mosley, 4th Baronet, of Ancoats (1848–1915), British baronet and landowner
- Sir Oswald Mosley, 5th Baronet, of Ancoats (1873–1928)

== See also ==
- Mosley baronets
