= Crauford =

Crauford is both a surname and a masculine given name. Notable people with the name include:

- W. H. Lane Crauford (1884–1955), English writer
- Crauford Kent (1881–1953), English-born American actor
- Florence Crauford Grove (1838–1902), English mountain climber and writer

== See also ==
- Crauford baronets
