= Mosley baronets =

Set index for Mosley baronets

There have been three baronetcies created for members of the Mosley family, one in the Baronetage of England and two in the Baronetage of Great Britain. One creation is extant.

- Mosley baronets of Rolleston (1st creation, 1640)
- Mosley baronets of Rolleston (2nd creation, 1720)
- Mosley baronets of Ancoats (1781): from 1980 united with Baron Ravensdale

== Title succession chart ==
Title succession chart

Title succession chart, Mosley baronets (all creations).
{{tree chart|SOM2Bt| |SJM3Bt| |SJM1Bt|SOM2Bt=Sir Oswald Mosley
2nd Baronet
1705–1757|SJM3Bt=Sir John Mosley
3rd Baronet
a. 1705 – 1779|SJM1Bt=Sir John Mosley
1st Baronet
1732–1798

Edward Moseley died 1571
Sir Nicholas Mosley; 1527–1612; Lord Mayor of London; 1599	Anthony Moseley; 1537–1607
Rowland Mosley; 1558–1616	Oswald Mosley died 1616
1640 creation
Sir Edward Mosley; 1st Baronet; 1616–1657	Nicholas Mosley; 1611–1672
Sir Edward Mosley; 2nd Baronet; 1639–1665	Oswald Mosley; 1639–1726	Nicholas Mosley died 1697
Baronetcy extinct
1720 creation
Sir Oswald Mosley; 1st Baronet; 1674–1751	Nicholas Mosley c. 1693 – 1734/5
1781 creation
Baronetcy extinct
Oswald Mosley; 1761–1789
Sir Oswald Mosley; 2nd Baronet; 1785–1871
Oswald Mosley; 1804–1856	Sir Tonman Mosley; 3rd Baronet; 1813–1890
Baron Anslow
Sir Oswald Mosley; 4th Baronet; 1848–1915	Tonman Mosley; 1st Baron Anslow; 1850–1933
Barony extinct
Sir Oswald Mosley; 5th Baronet; 1873–1928
Sir Oswald Mosley; 6th Baronet; 1896–1980
Nicholas Mosley; 3rd Baron Ravensdale; 7th Baronet; 1923–2017
Hon. Shaun Mosley; 1949–2009
Daniel Mosley; 4th Baron Ravensdale; 8th Baronet born 1982
Hon. Alexander Mosley born 2012
