= Crimson Mask =

Crimson Mask may refer to:

- Crimson Mask (character), a fictional character from Thrilling Publications
- Crimson mask, a professional wrestling term to describe a wrestler's face being covered in his own blood, most often due to blading
- Crimson Mask (novel), a crime novel by W. H. Lane Crauford
