= Fairy Investigation Society =

Investigative society dedicated to compiling information and sightings of fairies

The Fairy Investigation Society (or the Society for the Investigation of Fairies) was a semi-secret occult group devoted to collecting evidence and information about the existence of fairies and to organize documented instances of fairy sightings. The society was founded in Britain in 1927 by Capt. Sir Quintin Craufurd, MBE and the artist Bernard Sleigh.

== Background ==
=== Spiritualism ===
Spiritualism in the Western world began in the United States in 1848 and moved its way across the Atlantic to Britain in 1852. Spiritualism does not have a central organization, instead it is most like an ideology in which individualism is highly prized through religion. Spiritualists believe in the preservation of the soul after death and that the soul continues to exist in the physical world. The rise of spiritualism influenced an interest in the West with all things mystical from ghosts and seances, tarot (Hermetic Order of the Golden Dawn), to fairies. The disillusionment of World War One continued to fuel the rise of spiritualism which correlates to the establishment and growth of the Fairy Investigation Society.

=== Cottingley Fairies ===
During World War One two young cousins from Cottingley, England, Elsie Wright and Frances Griffiths, took photographs of themselves with cardboard cutouts of fairies in their garden. Elsie's mother had shared the photos at a Bradford Theosophical Society meeting on nature spirits. They then gained the attention of Sir Arthur Conan Doyle, author of the Sherlock Holmes series and notable member of the Fairy Investigation Society. He published the photos along with an article in the 1920 Christmas edition of the Strand Magazine. The photos made international headlines, and the Fairy Investigation Society acquired momentum toward its creation.

== History ==
The Fairy Investigation Society was inspired by cofounder Barnard Sleigh's 1926 novel entitled The Gates of the Horn Being Sundry Records from the Proceedings of the Society for the Investigation of Faery Fact & Fallacy. Included in the book were ten short stories describing tales of fairy encounters through reports of the society, which monitored fairy-human relations. The book solidified a "fairy ideology" first recognizing fairies as sort of guardians of an ecologically damaged world. While The Gates of Horn was not commercially successful, readers were so convinced by Sleigh's realistic portrayal of Edwardian occult and spiritualism that some reviewers of the time wondered whether this supposedly fictional society described by Sleigh actually existed.

During its prime, in the 1920s and 1930s, the society organized meetings, lectures, and discussions for collecting evidence of fairy life. With World War II, however, the society's records were largely lost or destroyed. The society was inactive until 1949 when Craufurd revived it with the help of Nottingham secretary Marjorie Johnson. Johnson wrote newsletters through the 1950s and helped create a survey of living fairylore, later published as Seeing Fairies.

During the late 1950s there were well over a hundred members, including famous individuals such as author Alasdair Alpin MacGregor, Wellesley Tudor Pole, Ithell Colquhoun, Leslie Alan Shepard, RAF commander Sir Hugh Dowding, Victor Purcell, Walter Starkie (of gypsy lore fame), Naomi Mitchison and animator Walt Disney.

According to folklore historian Simon Young, a condition of membership was a genuine belief in fairies. Craufard, for instance, was a pioneer of wireless technology with the Royal Navy who believed he had established communication with marsh elves on the outskirts of London, and that on one occasion they had told him where to dig for treasure.

A 1960 newspaper article in the Sunday Pictorial ridiculed Marjorie Johnson, who began to withdraw from her role in the society. The society was only semi-active under her successor Leslie Shepard, based in Blackrock, Dublin, Ireland, finally closing down in the early 1990s.

The society was reestablished online by Young in 2013. It has an anonymous membership list and no longer requires members to believe in fairies. Enthusiasts, researchers and skeptics are all welcome among the renewed ranks of the FIS. As of 2021, the Society publishes two newsletters a year.

== Goals of the society ==
The main objective of the society was to compile evidence in the form of anecdotes, letters, and popular accounts of fairy sightings. It was believed that seeing fairies was a clairvoyant ability, and that these beings could "connect us to nature and open the human soul to a higher metaphysical world." The ability to see fairies was also connected to religious belief, with an inextricable connection to British spiritualism.

A typical meeting of the Fairy Investigation Society began with a speech by the chairman, who would offer the cases of fairy evidence "under close observation." A toast would be offered to the fairies, followed by a discussion of financial reports, forthcoming cases, and reports to be signed by all members.

Upon its resurgence, some of the stated goals were to establish a bi-annual newsletter, launch a website containing fairy resources, and to gather a census of reported fairy experiences to be made publicly available.

After the reestablishment of the society in 2013, Young said that the group is "more successful than ever" and even has "more members than the original."

== Notable members ==
=== Sir Quentin C.A. Craufurd ===
Captain Sir Quentin C.A. Craufurd, MBE, (1875-1957), co-founded the Fairy Investigation Society. Crauford was from an aristocratic background, a member of the Craufurd Baronets, and a naval officer. While in the navy, he appeared to have picked up a fascination with wireless telephone communication. Indeed, he was authorised by the Admiralty to create an experimental radio station to broadcast to the fleet in Chatham from HMS Andromeda, the first wireless broadcast of music and speech for the purpose of entertainment in Britain. In the 1920s, he began to experiment with wireless technology to contact the spirit world, and became very well known in spiritualist circles. In founding the Fairy Investigation Society, his role was to deliver the scientific means of collecting evidence, via his telephone technology, while Barnard Sleigh would deliver the psychic means of contacting fairies. Crauford also experimented with other technologies in his attempt to contact fairies, including automatic writing and psychic photography.

=== Marjorie T. Johnson ===
Marjorie T. Johnson was a member of the Fairy Investigation Society in its later postwar iteration. She became acquainted with Craufurd in the 1940s, and in the 1950s she became the secretary of the Society, while Craufurd was the President. Johnson transcribed many of the Society's collected reports on fairy sightings into a volume called Seeing Fairies. These accounts collected by Johnson included her own experiences, anecdotes told to her, letters written to the Society, as well as "stray accounts that appeared in the media and on the radio." Johnson believed herself to be a "sensitive," and claimed to have seen fairies, as well as other elementals, angels, and entities.

=== Walt Disney ===
Walt Disney was also a member of the Fairy Investigation Society. He was certainly a member through 1956 and 1957, but sources speculate that he may have been interested in the group nearly 10 years earlier. In 1947, Disney visited Ireland to learn something of Irish folklore for storyboard research. "[H]e and his writers began exploring the idea of a film that would centre on 'the little people' in 1946" focusing on leprechauns and fairies.

== See also ==
- Cottingley Fairies
