= Apedale Hall =

Coordinates: 53°2′21.13″N 2°16′47.35″W

Apedale Hall was a manor house near Newcastle-under-Lyme in Staffordshire. The seat of the Heathcote family, it was rebuilt in 1826 in the Elizabethan style by the Staffordshire industrialist Richard Edensor Heathcote (1780–1850), but was demolished in 1934 due to subsidence from the coal mines underneath.

Oswald Mosley, British politician, known principally as the founder of the British Union of Fascists (BUF) lived there for a time in the early 20th century with his divorced mother, Katharine Maud Edwards-Heathcote (1873–1948), and his paternal grandfather Sir Oswald Mosley, 4th Baronet, before its demolition.
