= Oswald Mosley =

British fascist politician (1896–1980)

The Right Honourable Sir Oswald Mosley Bt
- Mosley in 1922

Leader of the British Union of Fascists (Note: Renamed the British Union of Fascists and National Socialists in 1936 and subsequently renamed the British Union in 1937.)
- In office 1 October 1932 – 10 July 1940
- Preceded by: Office established
- Succeeded by: Office abolished

Chancellor of the Duchy of Lancaster
- In office 7 June 1929 – 19 May 1930
- Prime Minister: Ramsay MacDonald
- Preceded by: Ronald McNeill
- Succeeded by: Clement Attlee

Member of Parliament
- In office 21 December 1926 – 7 October 1931
- Preceded by: John Davison
- Succeeded by: Roy Wise
- Constituency: Smethwick
- In office 14 December 1918 – 9 October 1924
- Preceded by: Harry Mallaby-Deeley
- Succeeded by: Sir Isidore Salmon
- Constituency: Harrow

Personal details
- Born: Oswald Ernald Mosley; 16 November 1896 Mayfair, London, England
- Died: 3 December 1980 (aged 84) Orsay, Essonne, France
- Party: Conservative (1918–1922); Labour (1924–1931); New Party (1931–1932); British Union of Fascists (1932–1940); Union Movement (1948–1973); National Party of Europe (1962–1980)
- Spouse(s): Lady Cynthia Curzon (m. 1920; died 1933) Hon. Diana Mitford (m. 1936)
- Children: 5, including Nicholas and Max
- Parent: Sir Oswald Mosley, 5th Baronet
- Relatives: Ivo Mosley (grandson); Louis Mosley (grandson); Daniel Mosley (great-grandson)
- Education: Winchester College; Royal Military College, Sandhurst

Military service
- Allegiance: British Empire
- Branch/service: British Army
- Years of service: 1914–1918
- Rank: Lieutenant
- Unit: 16th The Queen's Lancers; Royal Flying Corps
- Battles/wars: First World War; Second Battle of Ypres; Battle of Loos
- Awards: 1914–15 Star; British War Medal; Victory Medal

Sir Oswald Ernald Mosley, 6th Baronet (16 November 1896 – 3 December 1980), was a British far-right politician who rose to fame during the 1920s and 1930s when, disillusioned with mainstream politics, he turned to fascism. He was the Member of Parliament (MP) for Harrow from 1918 to 1924 and for Smethwick from 1926 to 1931. He founded the British Union of Fascists (BUF) in 1932 and led it until its forced disbandment in 1940.

After military service during the First World War, Mosley became the youngest sitting member of Parliament, representing Harrow from 1918, first as a member of the Conservative Party, then an independent, and finally joining the Labour Party. At the 1924 general election he stood in Birmingham Ladywood against the future Prime Minister Neville Chamberlain, coming within 100 votes of defeating him. Mosley returned to Parliament as the Labour MP for Smethwick at a by-election in 1926 and served as Chancellor of the Duchy of Lancaster in the Labour government of 1929–1931. In 1928 he succeeded his father as the sixth Mosley baronet, a title in his family for over a century. Some considered Mosley a rising star and a possible future prime minister. He resigned in 1930 over discord with the government's unemployment policies. He chose not to defend his Smethwick constituency at the 1931 general election, instead unsuccessfully standing in Stoke-on-Trent.

Mosley's New Party became the British Union of Fascists (BUF) in 1932. As its leader he publicly espoused antisemitism and established alliances with Benito Mussolini and Adolf Hitler. Fascist violence under Mosley's leadership culminated in the Battle of Cable Street in 1936, during which anti-fascist demonstrators including trade unionists, liberals, socialists, communists, anarchists and British Jews prevented the BUF from marching through the East End of London. Mosley subsequently held a series of rallies around London, and the BUF increased its membership there.

In 1939 Mosley was implicated in a fascist conspiracy organised by the Right Club against the British government by Archibald Maule Ramsay.

In May 1940, after the outbreak of the Second World War, Mosley was imprisoned and the BUF was made illegal. He was released in 1943 and, politically disgraced by his association with fascism, moved abroad in 1951, spending most of the remainder of his life in France and Ireland. He stood for Parliament during the post-war era but received relatively little support. During this period he was an advocate of pan-European nationalism, developing the Europe a Nation ideology, and was an early proponent of conspiracy theories concerning Holocaust denial.

== Early life ==
=== Childhood and education ===
Oswald Ernald Mosley was born on 16 November 1896 at 47 Hill Street, Mayfair, London. He was the eldest of the three sons of Sir Oswald Mosley, 5th Baronet (1873–1928), and Katharine Maud Edwards-Heathcote (1873–1948), daughter of Captain Justinian Edwards-Heathcote, of Apedale Hall, Staffordshire; they had been married the year before. He had two younger brothers: Edward Heathcote Mosley (1899–1980) and John Arthur Noel Mosley (1901–1973). His father was a third cousin to Claude Bowes-Lyon, 14th Earl of Strathmore and Kinghorne, making Mosley a fourth cousin to Queen Elizabeth the Queen Mother.

The progenitor, and earliest-attested ancestor, of the Mosley family was Ernald de Mosley (fl. 12th century), Lord of the Manor of Moseley, Staffordshire, during the reign of King John. Nicholas Mosley was a wealthy salesman in the 16th century, and was important in the development of Manchester, before eventually becoming Lord Mayor of London; the family took a violent part in the Peterloo Massacre. Two branches of the Mosley family existed – a significant cotton trading family who lived in Lancashire, and a farming family who lived in Rolleston; Oswald was descended from the former. The family were prominent landholders in Staffordshire and seated at Rolleston Hall, near Burton upon Trent. Three baronetcies were created, two of which are now extinct (see Mosley baronets for further history of the family); a barony was created for Tonman Mosley, brother of the 4th Baronet, but also became extinct. By the 19th century, reformers had taken control of the Manchester Court leet, which formerly belonged to the family, and the Mosleys had little influence by the latter half of the century. Oswald's grandfather Sir Oswald Mosley, 4th Baronet, was a campaigner against Jewish emancipation. Oswald noted in his autobiography My Life that he was glad to have come from an 'old English family'.

His mother wrote in her diary that his birth took 18 hours after he began to arrive at 6:00am, her own mother staying by her side for the whole duration. The family doctor, Sir John Williams, gave her chloroform and the baby was delivered at 11:40pm. Her husband, who was addicted to both gambling and alcohol, wrote a large number of letters to relatives about the event, and celebrated at the Epsom Derby; he was mostly an absent husband.

In childhood, Mosley moved from what he described as a "wayside house" to Rolleston Hall, which had been inherited in 1879 by the 4th Baronet. The Hall was a large building maintained by gardeners and servants. Biographer Stephen Dorril has suggested that the treatment of the workers at the mansion, who laboured with no possibility to become more successful, may have impressed itself on Mosley's worldview and such treatment came to be part of his fascism.

Mosley loved his mother, toward whom he felt protective; in the 1970s, he burned her diaries to avoid investigative authors depicting her negatively, using them as evidence, although he kept the entries for the first four years of his own life, and for his mother's birthday, 2 January. Likewise, she celebrated Mosley and developed his ego. His father – nicknamed "Waldie" – was an amateur boxer, a Tory and a womaniser. Mosley's father gained the image of a scoundrel, although Mosley did not find the description to be accurate. Nonetheless, "Waldie" acted aggressively towards his wife and child, which led to Mosley idolising his mother instead. In 1901, when Mosley was aged five and while his mother was pregnant with her third child, the couple split over his womanising – Edwards-Heathcote had discovered letters revealing that her husband was saying and giving the same things to his other lovers as to her.

After Mosley's parents separated, he was raised by his mother, who went to live at Betton Hall near Market Drayton, and his paternal grandfather, Sir Oswald Mosley, 4th Baronet. His mother had a small alimony, and was impoverished by comparison to the rest of the family. As Mosley rarely was able to see his father, his mother became more attached to him. His grandfather took the role of a male parental figure in Mosley's life; likewise, his grandfather disliked his father, and saw Mosley as a substitute son. The 4th Baronet was seen as a masculine figure by Mosley, and developed his own masculine image based on his grandfather, alongside various pop-cultural ideas.

Mosley studied at West Downs School in Winchester from 1906 onward, eventually joined by Edward, where Oswald developed a reputation as a debater. He then joined Winchester College in 1909 at the age of 12, a year early, and found school both hard and boring; (Note: In Mosley 1968, p. 35, Mosley claims that it was "only relieved by learning and homosexuality" and that he did not enjoy either. Dorril 2006, p. 11, explains the second in that his appearance made him "subject to male attention".) he did not socialise. During this period he hunted extensively, shooting 50 partridges, 18 pheasants, 11 rabbits and 10 hares over the winter from 1909 to 1910, as well as fishing at Rolleston. He also became a boxer by age 15, winning a light-weight championship, and attempted to enter the Public Schools' boxing championship, but was forbidden to do so by his headmaster; Mosley then took up fencing instead. He was a fencing champion in his school days, winning titles in both foil and sabre, and becoming the first boy to win both and the youngest to win either at the Public Schools' championship. He retained an enthusiasm for the sport throughout his life.

=== Military service ===
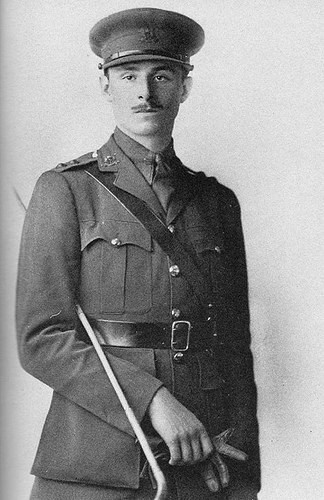
Mosley in officer uniform

Mosley left college in 1912, briefly staying in Brest, France in summer 1913, where he competed in fencing. After returning to England, he became keen on entering the army, entering the Royal Military College, Sandhurst in January 1914. He considered his period at the military college to be "one of the happiest times of [his] entire life”, but was expelled in June for a "riotous act of retaliation" against a fellow student. John Masters made a claim that Mosley was thrown out of a window by other cadets; according to Dorril, he had actually slipped and fallen while recruiting for the retaliation against a group of cadets who had attacked him. He was sent away from the college that weekend.

During the First World War, he was commissioned into the British cavalry unit the 16th The Queen's Lancers and fought in France on the Western Front. He transferred to the Royal Flying Corps as a pilot and an air observer, but while demonstrating in front of his mother and sister he crashed, which left him with a permanent limp, as well as a reputation for being brave and somewhat reckless. He returned to the Lancers, but was invalided out with an injured leg. He spent the remainder of the war at desk jobs in the Ministry of Munitions and in the Foreign Office.

=== Marriage to Lady Cynthia Curzon ===
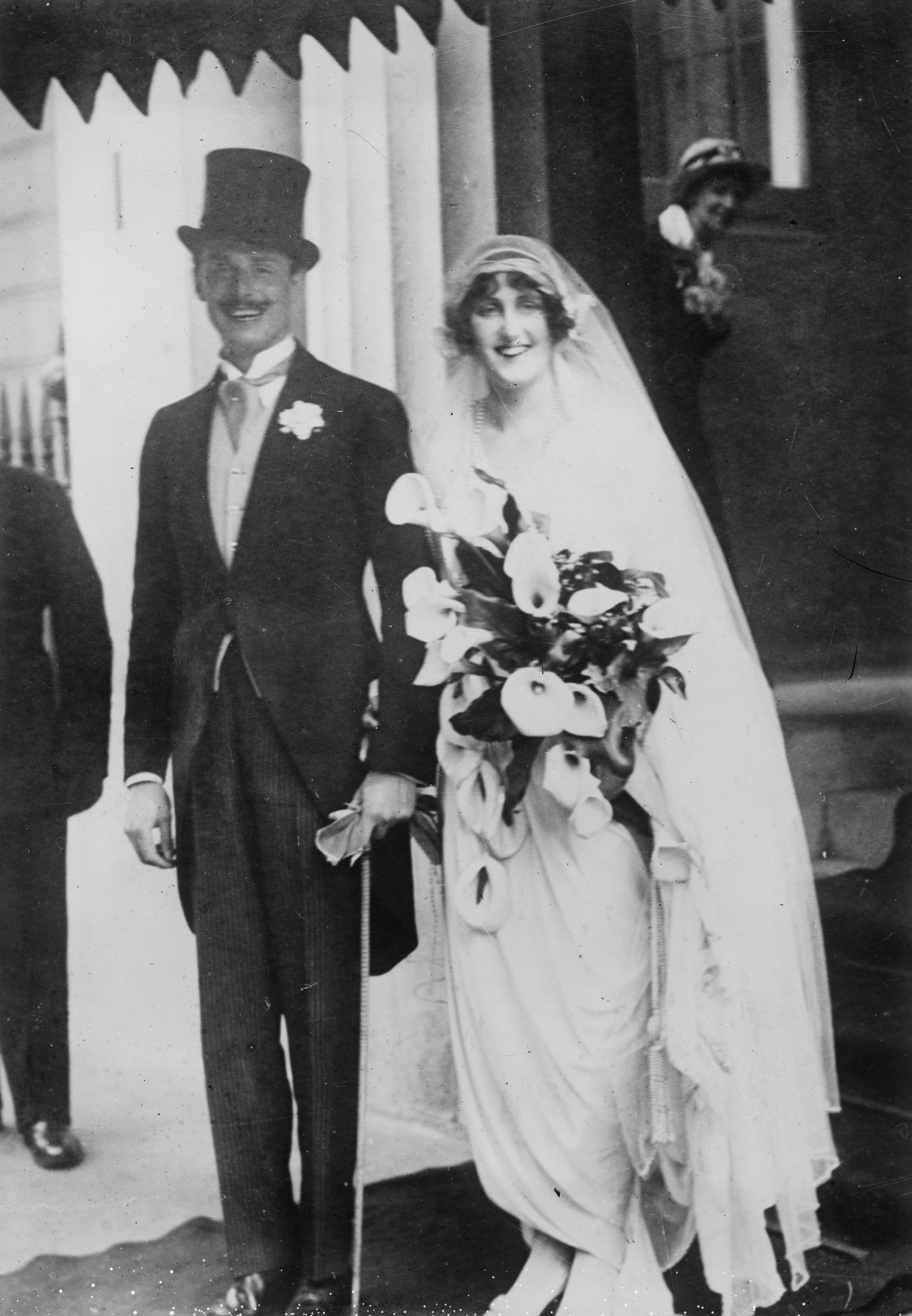
Oswald Mosley and Lady Cynthia Curzon on their wedding day, 11 May 1920

On 11 May 1920, Mosley married Lady Cynthia "Cimmie" Curzon, the second daughter of George Curzon, 1st Marquess Curzon of Kedleston, the Foreign Secretary and former Viceroy of India, and Lord Curzon's first wife, the American mercantile heiress Mary Leiter. It was later alleged by Arnold Leese, a political rival of Mosley's in the early 1930s who founded the Imperial Fascist League and considered the BUF to be insufficiently antisemitic, that Cynthia had been "of Jewish descent", and falsely claimed that she "had had a Jewish grandfather." In March 1920, Mosley met Lord Curzon to inform him about the marriage and request his approval. In a letter written afterwards to his American-born second wife, Grace Curzon, Marchioness Curzon of Kedleston, his future father-in-law made the casually antisemitic remark that Mosley possessed a "rather a Jewish appearance."

Lord Curzon had to be persuaded that Mosley was a suitable husband, as he suspected Mosley was largely motivated by social advancement in Conservative Party politics and Cynthia's inheritance. The wedding took place in the Chapel Royal in St James's Palace in London. The hundreds of guests included King George V and Queen Mary, as well as foreign royalty such as the Duke and Duchess of Brabant (later King Leopold III and Queen Astrid of Belgium).

During his marriage to Cynthia, Mosley engaged in an extended affair with his wife's younger sister, Lady Alexandra Metcalfe, while also carrying on a separate affair with their stepmother Grace, who had been a widow since her husband's death in 1925. He succeeded to the Mosley baronetcy of Ancoats upon his father's death in 1928.

== Entering Westminster as a Conservative ==
Mosley was first encouraged to enter politics by F. E. Smith, 1st Earl of Birkenhead. By the end of the First World War Mosley, aged 21, had decided to go into politics as a member of Parliament, as he had no university education or practical experience because of the war. He was driven by, and in Parliament spoke of, a passionate conviction to avoid any future war, and this seemingly motivated his career. Uninterested in party labels, Mosley primarily identified himself as a representative of the "war generation" who would aim to create a "land fit for heroes". Largely because of his family background and war service, local Conservative and Liberal associations made appeals to Mosley in several constituencies.

Mosley considered contesting the constituency of Stone in his home county of Staffordshire, but ultimately chose the Conservative stronghold of Harrow, for it was closer to London and, as Mosley claimed, a seat that he sought to win on his own merits, free from family connections. On 23 July 1918 Mosley competed with three other candidates for the Conservative nomination at the upcoming general election. Though his 15-minute speech "fell flat", Mosley won over the 43 delegates with the "lucid and trenchant manner" in which he answered their questions. Mosley's opponent in the parliamentary election was an independent, A. R. Chamberlayne, an elderly solicitor who complained that the well-connected, wealthy Mosley was "a creature of the party machine" and too young to serve as a member of Parliament. Mosley retorted that many of Britain's greatest politicians entered Parliament between the ages of 19 to 25, such as Charles James Fox, William Pitt the Younger, William Ewart Gladstone, Henry John Temple, 3rd Viscount Palmerston and Robert Gascoyne-Cecil, 3rd Marquess of Salisbury. Mosley chose red as his campaign colour rather than the traditional blue associated with conservatism. Mosley easily defeated Chamberlayne with a majority of nearly 11,000.

He was the youngest member of the House of Commons to take his seat, although Joseph Sweeney, a Sinn Féin member, and therefore an abstentionist, was seven months younger. He soon distinguished himself as an orator and political player, one marked by confidence, and made a point of speaking in the Commons without notes.

Mosley was an early supporter of the economist John Maynard Keynes. Mosley's economic programme, which he coined "socialistic imperialism," advocated for improved industrial wages and hours, the nationalisation of electricity and transportation, slum-clearance, the protection of "essential industries" from "unfair competition," and higher government investment in education, child-welfare, and health services.

== Crossing the floor ==
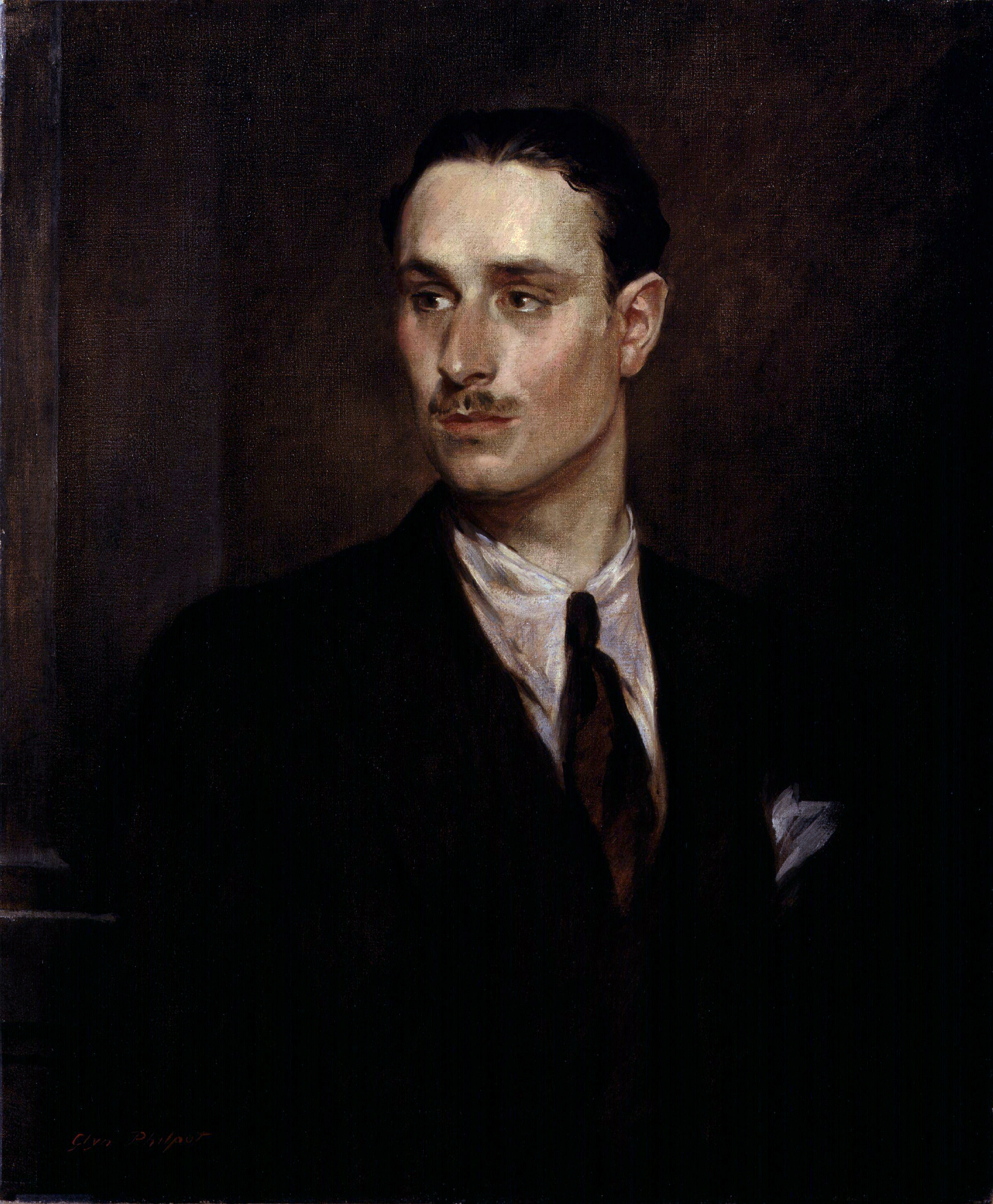
Portrait of Oswald Mosley by Glyn Philpot, 1925

Mosley was at this time falling out with the Conservatives over their Irish policy, and condemned the operations of the Black and Tans against civilians during the Irish War of Independence. He was secretary of the Peace with Ireland Council. As secretary of the council, he proposed sending a commission to Ireland to examine on-the-spot reprisals by the Black and Tans. T. P. O'Connor, a prominent MP of the Irish Parliamentary Party, later wrote to Mosley's wife Cynthia, "I regard him as the man who really began the break-up of the Black and Tan savagery." Mosley's initial speeches in parliament about the issue were moderate, and "he betrayed no sympathy for the IRA"; he even declared that "in the present state of Ireland one certainly cannot deny the right to shoot a man who, when challenged, refuses to hold up his hands. Anything of that sort is perfectly legitimate." However, as the conflict worsened and reports of atrocities committed by British forces increased, Mosley became more radical in his denunciations.

In his memoir, My Life, published in 1968, Mosley recalled that the war in Ireland had ‘evoked intense moral feeling’. With each atrocity committed by the Black and Tans he felt ‘that the name of Britain was being disgraced, every rule of good soldierly conduct disregarded, and every decent instinct of humanity outraged’.

Mosley became "one of a small handful of MPs who pursued" then Prime Minister David Lloyd George and the Chief Secretary for Ireland, Sir Hamar Greenwood, "over the unacknowledged policy of reprisals." However, "[t]he root of Mosley’s case against the Black and Tans was that their behaviour undermined the superiority of British imperial rule."

In mid-1920, Mosley issued a memorandum proposing that Britain's governance over Ireland should mirror the policy of the United States towards Cuba, in effect granting Ireland internal autonomy while retaining British oversight regarding defence and foreign policy matters. In November 1920, he questioned Greenwood directly in Parliament on the case of Eileen Quinn, a young pregnant mother who was shot and killed in County Galway by the Black and Tans.

In late 1920, Mosley crossed the floor to sit as an independent MP on the opposition side of the House of Commons. Having built up a following in his constituency, he retained it against a Conservative challenge in the 1922 and 1923 general elections.

The Liberal Westminster Gazette wrote that Mosley was "the most polished literary speaker in the Commons, words flow from him in graceful epigrammatic phrases that have a sting in them for the government and the Conservatives. To listen to him is an education in the English language, also in the art of delicate but deadly repartee. He has human sympathies, courage and brains."

== Joining Labour ==
"We have made the acquaintance of the most brilliant man in the House of Commons - Oswald Mosley. 'Here is the perfect politician who is also a perfect gentleman,' said I to myself as he entered the room....He is also an accomplished orator in the old grand style, and an assiduous worker in the modern manner - keeps two secretaries at work supplying himself with information but realizes that he himself has to do the thinking! So much perfection argues rottenness somewhere...he seems to combine great personal charm with solid qualities of character, aristocratic refinement with democratic opinions."

— Beatrice Webb, 8 June 1923

By now Mosley was drifting to the political left and gaining the attention of both the Liberals and Labour for his foreign policy polemics, which advocated for a strong League of Nations and isolationism (i.e. Britain should only go to war if it or the British Empire were attacked). Mosley was growing increasingly attracted to the Labour Party, which had recently formed its first government (under Ramsay MacDonald) after the 1923 general election. On 27 March 1924 Mosley applied for party membership. Shortly thereafter he joined the Independent Labour Party (ILP). MacDonald, who believed that aristocratic members gave Labour an air of respectability, was congratulated by The Manchester Guardian on "the fine new recruit he has secured."

=== Unsuccessfully challenging Chamberlain ===
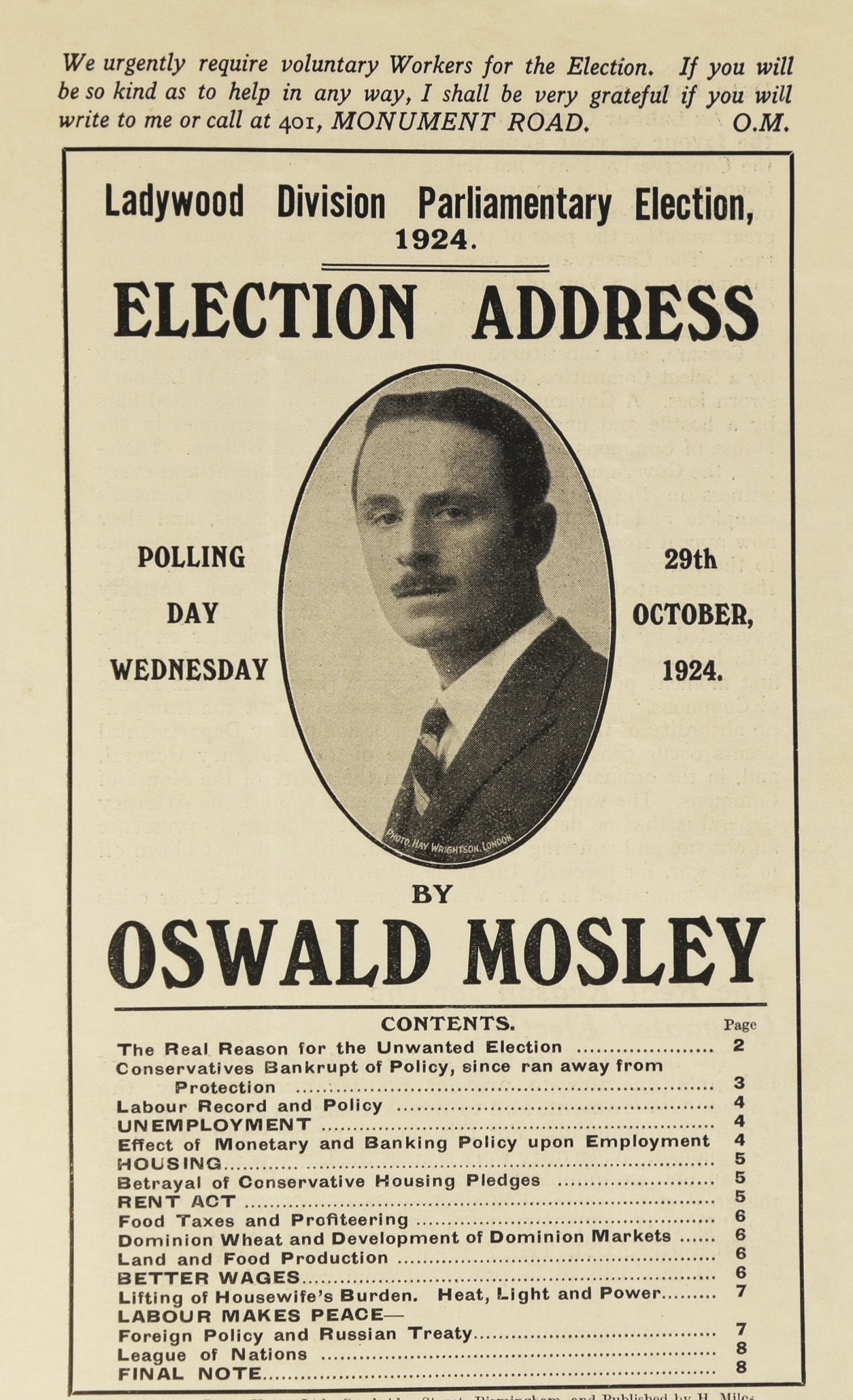
Election pamphlet for Mosley's 1924 Birmingham Ladywood campaign against Neville Chamberlain

When the government fell in October, Mosley had to choose a new seat, as he believed that Harrow would not re-elect him as a Labour candidate. He therefore decided to oppose Neville Chamberlain in Birmingham Ladywood. Mosley campaigned aggressively in Ladywood, and accused Chamberlain of being a "landlords' hireling" in reference to Chamberlain's controversial Rent Act of 1923. Chamberlain, outraged, demanded Mosley to retract the claim "as a gentleman". Mosley, whom Stanley Baldwin described as "a cad and a wrong 'un", refused to withdraw the allegation. Mosley was noted for bringing excitement and energy to the campaign. Leslie Hore-Belisha, then a Liberal politician who later became a senior Conservative, recorded his impressions of Mosley as a platform orator at this time:

"Dark, aquiline, flashing: tall, thin, assured; defiance in his eye, contempt in his forward chin."

Together, Oswald and Cynthia Mosley proved an alluring couple, and many members of the working class in Birmingham succumbed to their charm for, as the historian Martin Pugh described, "a link with powerful, wealthy and glamorous men and women appealed strongly to those who endured humdrum and deprived lives". It took several re-counts before Chamberlain was declared the winner by 77 votes. Mosley blamed poor weather for the result. His period outside Parliament was used to develop a new economic policy for the ILP, which eventually became known as the Birmingham Proposals; they continued to form the basis of Mosley's economics until the end of his political career.

Mosley was critical of Sir Winston Churchill's policy as Chancellor of the Exchequer. After Churchill returned Britain to the gold standard, Mosley claimed that, "faced with the alternative of saying goodbye to the gold standard, and therefore to his own employment, and goodbye to other people's employment, Mr. Churchill characteristically selected the latter course."

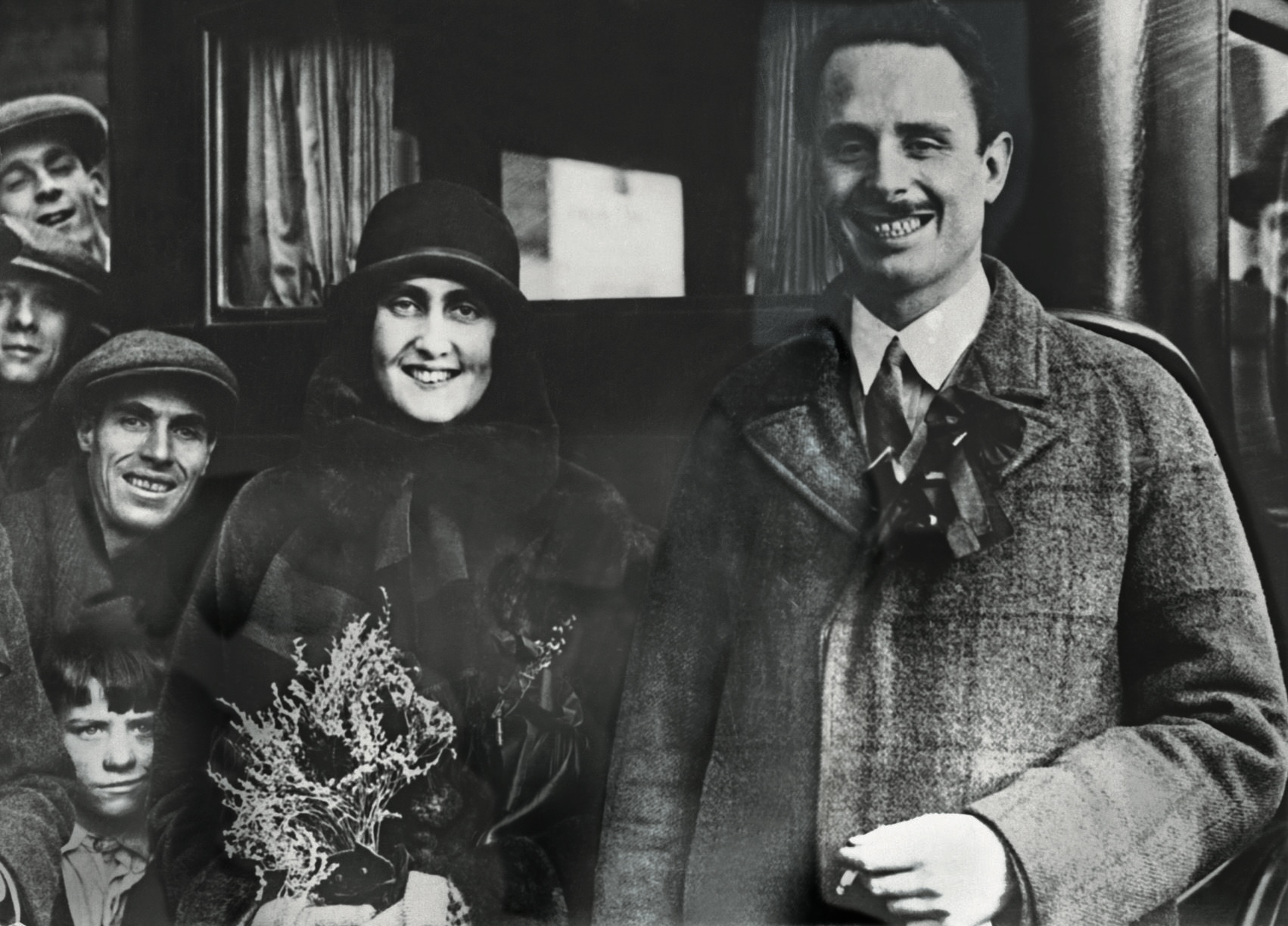
Oswald and Cynthia Mosley with working-class supporters in Birmingham, 1924

=== India and Gandhi ===
Among his many travels, Mosley, accompanied by Lady Cynthia, travelled in the winter of 1924 to British India, which he would later characterise as "a land of contrast, of ineffable beauty and of darkest sorrow, a jewel of the world, which challenges mankind to save it". His father-in-law's past as Viceroy of India allowed for the acquaintance of various personalities along the journey. They travelled by ship and stopped briefly in Cairo in the Kingdom of Egypt.

Having initially arrived in Ceylon (present-day Sri Lanka), the journey then continued through mainland India. They spent these initial days in the government house of Ceylon, followed by Madras and then Calcutta, where the governor at the time was Victor Bulwer-Lytton, 2nd Earl of Lytton. During this journey Mosley came in contact with many prominent activists, including Muhammad Ali Jinnah, Chittaranjan Das and Motilal Nehru.

Mosley met Mahatma Gandhi through Charles Freer Andrews, a clergyman and an intimate friend of the "Indian Saint", as Mosley described him. They met in Kadda, where Gandhi was quick to invite him to a private conference in which Gandhi was chairman. Mosley later called Gandhi a "sympathetic personality of subtle intelligence".

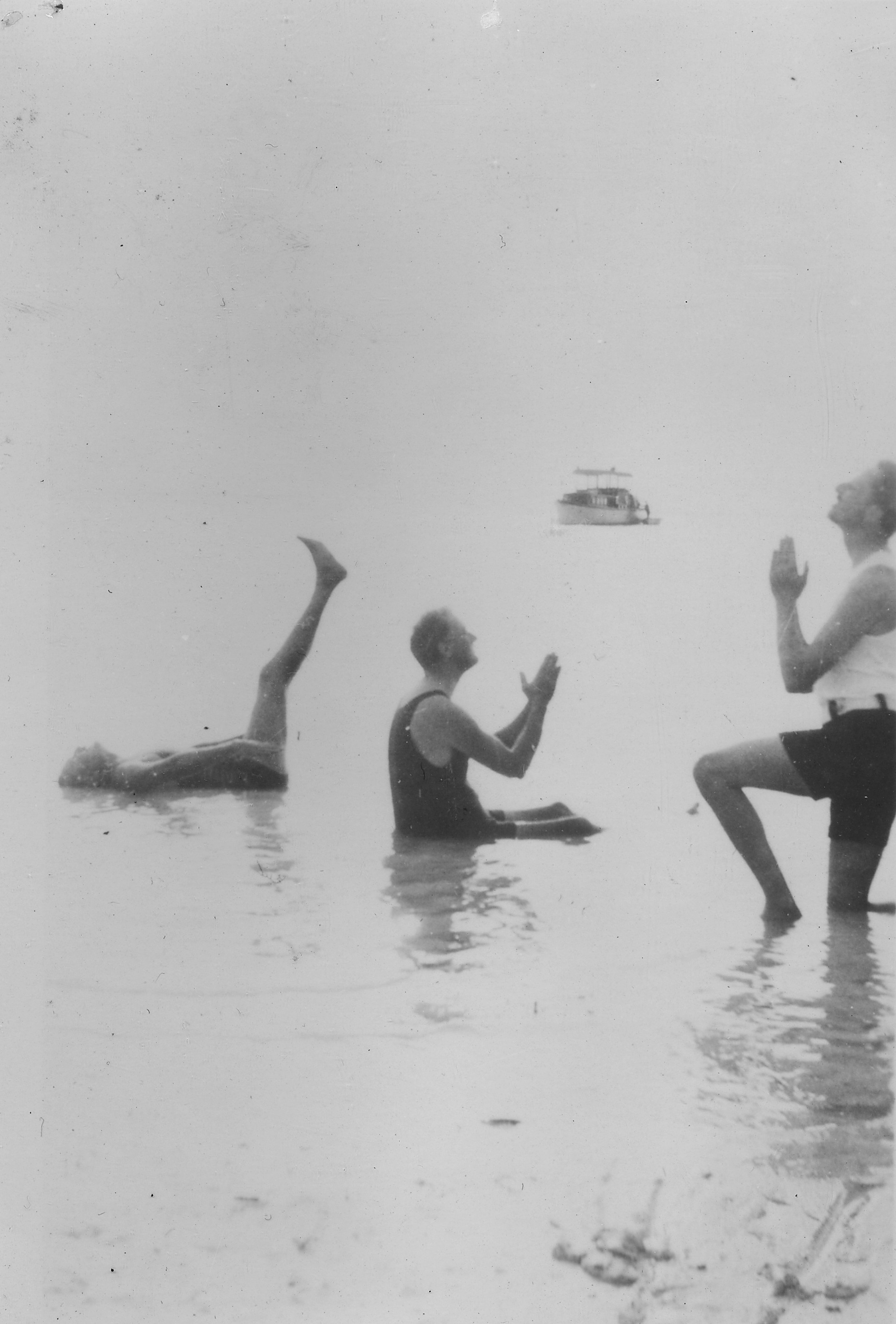
Mosley (right) swimming with Franklin D. Roosevelt (centre) and Maunsell Crosby (left) in Florida, February 1926

=== Return to Parliament ===
On 22 November 1926 the Labour-held seat of Smethwick fell vacant upon the resignation of John Davison, and Mosley was confident that this seat would return him to Westminster (having lost against Chamberlain in 1924). In his autobiography Mosley felt that the campaign was dominated by Conservative attacks on him for being too rich, including claims that he was covering up his wealth. In fact, during this campaign, the Daily Mail frequently attacked "Mr. Silver Spoon Mosley" for preaching socialism "in a twenty guineas Savile Row suit" while Lady Cynthia wore a "charming dress glittering with diamonds." As the historian Robert Skidelsky writes, "The papers were full of gossipy items about the wealthy socialist couple frolicking on the Riviera, spending thousands of pounds in renovating their 'mansion' and generally living a debauched aristocratic life." The recurring accusation against Mosley was that he was a "champagne socialist" who "never did a day's work in his life." Mosley, in response, told his Smethwick supporters, "While I am being abused by the Capitalist Press I know I am doing effective work for the Labour cause." At the by-election's polling day (21 December), Mosley was victorious with a majority of 6,582 over the Conservative candidate, M. J. Pike.

"This is not a by-election, it is history. The result of this election sends out a message to every worker in the land. You have met and beaten the Press of reaction....Tonight all Britain looks to you and thanks you. My wonderful friends of Smethwick, by your heroic battle against a whole world in arms, I believe you have introduced a new era for British democracy."

— Oswald Mosley, election victory speech, 21 December 1926

In 1927, he mocked the British Fascists as "black-shirted buffoons, making a cheap imitation of ice-cream sellers". The ILP elected him to Labour's National Executive Committee.

Mosley and Cynthia were committed Fabians in the 1920s and at the start of the 1930s. Mosley appears in a list of names of Fabians from Fabian News and the Fabian Society Annual Report 1929–31. He was Kingsway Hall lecturer in 1924 and Livingstone Hall lecturer in 1931.

== Office ==
=== Chancellor of the Duchy of Lancaster ===
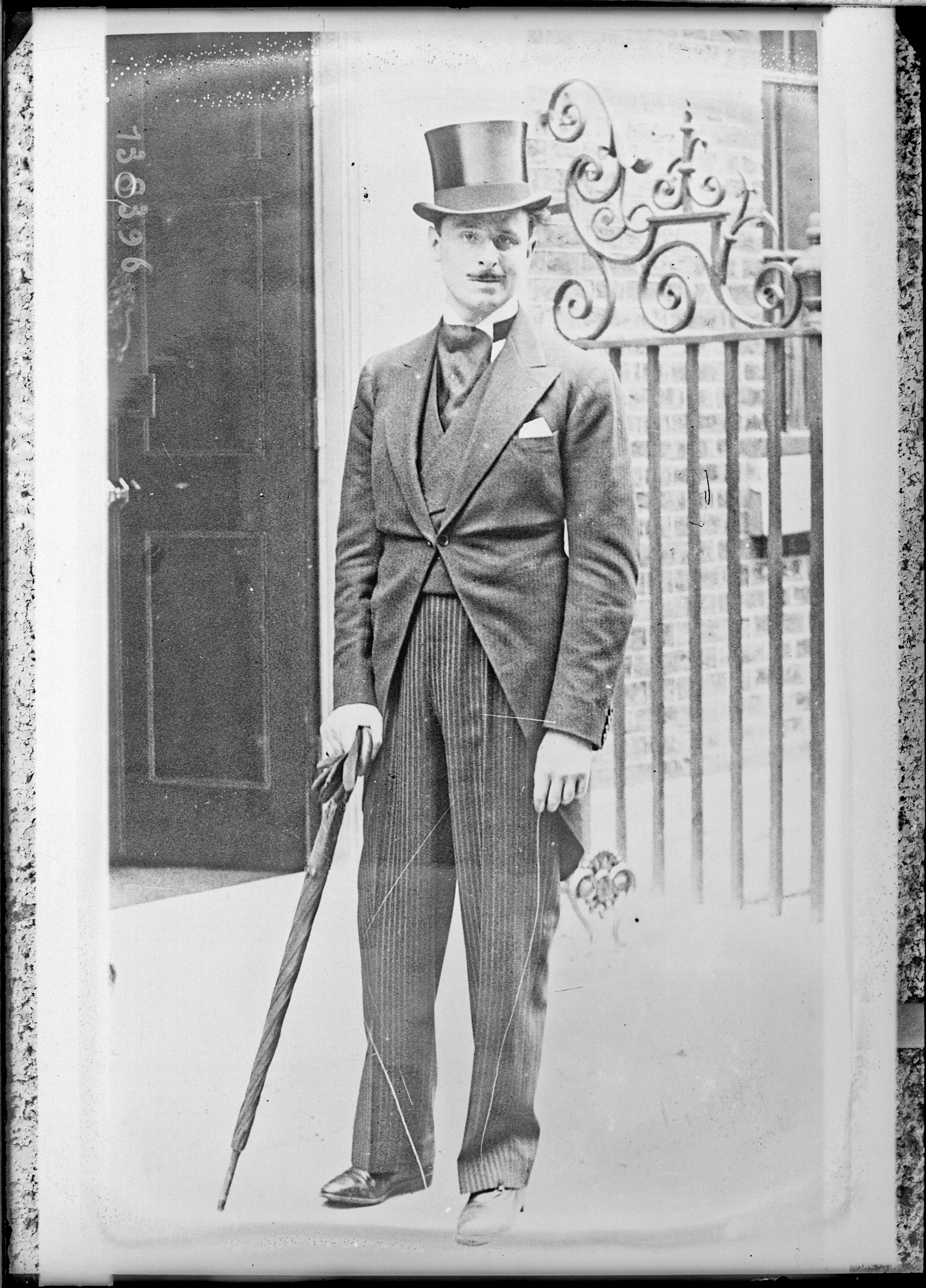
Mosley as a young minister in front of 10 Downing Street, c. 1929

Mosley then made a bold bid for political advancement within the Labour Party. He was close to Ramsay MacDonald and hoped for one of the Great Offices of State, but when Labour won the 1929 general election he was appointed only to the post of Chancellor of the Duchy of Lancaster, a position without portfolio. He was given responsibility for solving the unemployment problem, but found that his radical proposals were blocked either by Lord Privy Seal James Henry Thomas or by the Cabinet.

=== Mosley Memorandum ===
Realising the economic uncertainty that was facing the nation because of the death of its domestic industry, Mosley put forward a scheme in the "Mosley Memorandum" that called for high tariffs to protect British industries from international finance and transform the British Empire into an autarkic trade bloc, for state nationalisation of main industries, for higher school-leaving ages and pensions to reduce the labour surplus, and for a programme of public works to solve interwar poverty and unemployment. Furthermore, the memorandum laid out the foundations of the corporate state (not to be confused with corporatocracy) which intended to combine businesses, workers and the government into one body as a way to "Obliterate class conflict and make the British economy healthy again".

Mosley published this memorandum because of his dissatisfaction with the laissez-faire attitudes held by both Labour and the Conservative party, and their passivity towards the ever-increasing globalisation of the world, and thus looked to a modern solution to fix a modern problem. But it was rejected by the Cabinet and by the Parliamentary Labour Party, and in May 1930 Mosley resigned from his ministerial position. At the time, according to Lady Mosley's autobiography, the weekly Liberal-leaning paper The Nation and Athenaeum wrote: "The resignation of Sir Oswald Mosley is an event of capital importance in domestic politics... We feel that Sir Oswald has acted rightly—as he has certainly acted courageously in declining to share any longer in the responsibility for inertia." In October he attempted to persuade the Labour Party Conference to accept the Memorandum, but was defeated again.

The Mosley Memorandum won the support of the economist John Maynard Keynes, who stated that "it was a very able document and illuminating". Keynes also wrote,

"I like the spirit which informs the document. A scheme of national economic planning to achieve a right, or at least a better, balance of our industries between the old and the new, between agriculture and manufacture, between home development and foreign investment; and wide executive powers to carry out the details of such a scheme. That is what it amounts to. ... [The] manifesto offers us a starting point for thought and action. ... It will shock—it must do so—the many good citizens of this country... who have laissez-faire in their craniums, their consciences, and their bones ... But how anyone professing and calling himself a socialist can keep away from the manifesto is a more obscure matter."

According to Lady Mosley's autobiography, thirty years later, in 1961, Richard Crossman wrote: "this brilliant memorandum was a whole generation ahead of Labour thinking." As his book, The Greater Britain, focused on the issues of free trade, the criticisms against globalisation that he formulated can be found in critiques of contemporary globalisation. He warns nations that buying cheaper goods from other nations may seem appealing but ultimately ravage domestic industry and lead to large unemployment, as seen in the 1930s. He argues that trying to "challenge the 50-year-old system of free trade... exposes industry in the home market to the chaos of world conditions, such as price fluctuation, dumping, and the competition of sweated labour, which result in the lowering of wages and industrial decay."

In a newspaper feature, Mosley was described as "a strange blend of J.M. Keynes and Major Douglas of credit fame". From July 1930 he began to demand that government must be turned from a "talk-shop" into a "workshop."

In 1992, Prime Minister John Major examined Mosley's ideas to find an unorthodox solution to the aftermath of the 1990–91 economic recession.

== New Party ==
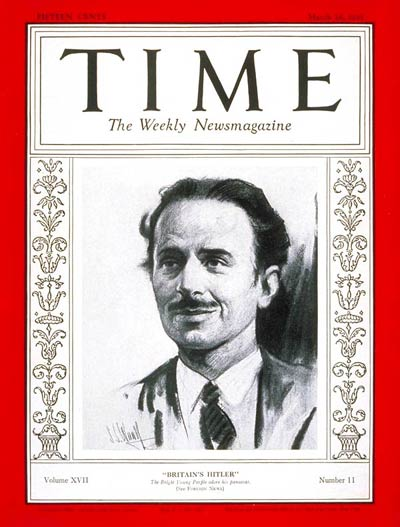
Mosley on the cover of Time in 1931

Dissatisfied with the Labour Party, Mosley and six other Labour MPs (two of whom resigned after one day) founded the New Party.

Its early parliamentary contests, in the 1931 Ashton-under-Lyne by-election and subsequent by-elections, arguably had a spoiler effect in splitting the left-wing vote and allowing Conservative candidates to win. Despite this, the organisation gained support among many Labour and Conservative politicians who agreed with his corporatist economic policy, and among these were Aneurin Bevan and the future prime minister Harold Macmillan. Mosley's corporatism was complemented by Keynesianism, with Robert Skidelsky stating, "Keynesianism was his great contribution to fascism."

The New Party increasingly inclined to fascist policies, but Mosley was denied the opportunity to establish his party when during the Great Depression the 1931 general election was suddenly called. The party's candidates, including Mosley himself running in Stoke which had been held by his wife, lost the seats they held and won none. As the New Party gradually became more radical and authoritarian, many previous supporters defected from it. According to Lady Mosley's autobiography, shortly after the 1931 election Mosley was described by The Manchester Guardian:

When Sir Oswald Mosley sat down after his Free Trade Hall speech in Manchester and the audience, stirred as an audience rarely is, rose and swept a storm of applause towards the platform—who could doubt that here was one of those root-and-branch men who have been thrown up from time to time in the religious, political and business story of England. First that gripping audience is arrested, (Note: Arrested in the sense of stunned or gripped.) then stirred and finally, as we have said, swept off its feet by a tornado of peroration yelled at the defiant high pitch of a tremendous voice.

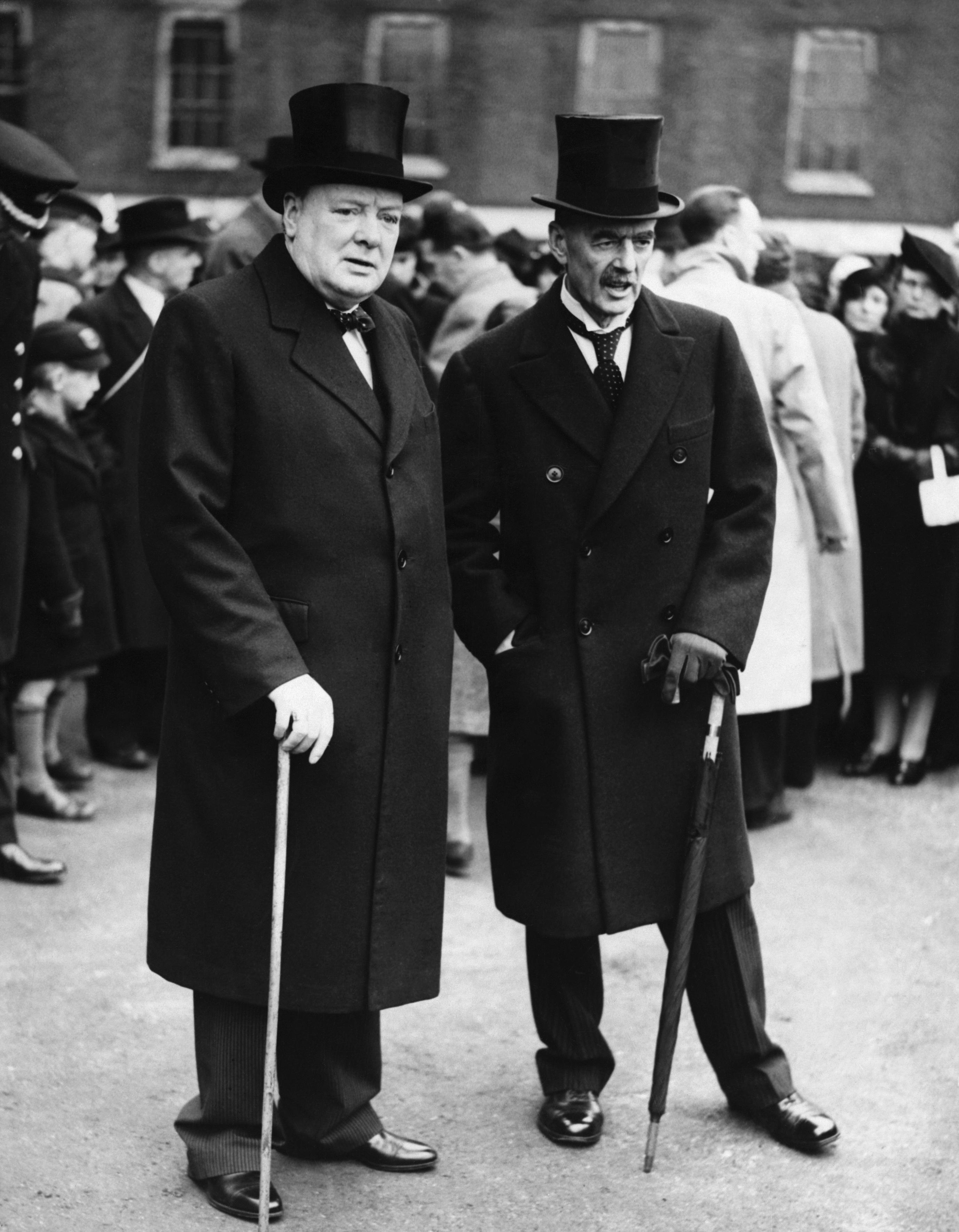
Before Mosley founded the British Union of Fascists, many political figures, such as Winston Churchill and Neville Chamberlain, attempted to woo him to their side.

Harold Nicolson, editor of the New Party's newspaper, Action, recorded in his diary that Mosley personally decided to pursue fascism and the formation of a "trained and disciplined force" on 21 September 1931, following a recent Communist-organised disturbance at a public meeting attended by 20,000 people in Glasgow Green. Approximately four weeks before the general election, Mosley was approached by Neville Chamberlain to ally with the newly-formed National Government coalition led by Baldwin and MacDonald, with Nicolson writing that "the Tories are anxious to get some of us in and are prepared to do a secret deal." Throughout early 1932 David Margesson, the chief whip of the Conservatives, continually attempted to persuade Mosley to rejoin the party. Meanwhile, Mosley was also approached by right-wing "die hards" who opposed the National Government and Baldwin's "centrist" leadership of the Conservative Party. This group included Winston Churchill, who "[promised] to come out in his support" should Mosley contest a by-election, and Harold Harmsworth, 1st Viscount Rothermere, the owner of the Daily Mail and the Daily Mirror. In addition, Nicolson noted that Mosley was being courted by Joseph Kenworthy to "lead the Labour Party." In the end, however, Mosley refused to return to the "machine" of the "old parties." Convinced that fascism was the necessary path for Britain, the New Party was dissolved in April 1932.

== Fascism ==
Flag of the British Union of Fascists

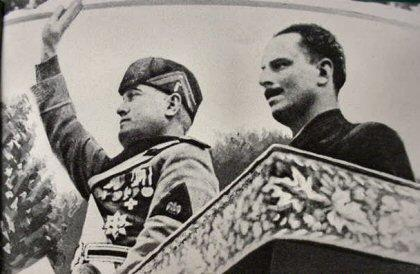
Benito Mussolini with Mosley during his visit to Italy in April 1933

After his election failure in 1931, Mosley went on a study tour of the "new movements" of Italy's Duce Benito Mussolini and other fascists, and returned convinced, particularly by Fascist Italy's economic programme, that it was the way forward for Britain. He was determined to unite the existing fascist movements and created the British Union of Fascists (BUF) in 1932.

The British historian Matthew Worley argues that Mosley's adoption of fascism stemmed from three key factors. First, Mosley interpreted the Great Slump as proof that Britain's economy, which had historically favoured liberal capitalism, required a fundamental overhaul to survive the rise of cheap, global competition. Second, as a result of his experience as a Labour minister, Mosley grew to resent the apparent gridlock inherent in parliamentary democracy (see criticism of democracy). Mosley believed that party politics, parliamentary debate, and the formalities of bill passage hindered effective action in addressing the pressing economic issues of the post-war world. Finally, Mosley became convinced that the Labour Party was not an effective vehicle for the promulgation of "the radical measures that he believed were necessary to prevent Britain’s decline." As Worley notes about Mosley, "Cast adrift from the political mainstream, he saw two alternative futures. One was the 'slow and almost imperceptible decline' of Britain to the 'level of a Spain'...[and the other] a deepening sense of crisis opening the way for a 'constructive alternative' to take the place of both liberal capitalism and parliamentary democracy." Mosley believed that Britain was in danger of a Communist revolution, which only fascism could effectively combat.

The BUF was protectionist, strongly anti-communist and nationalistic to the point of advocating authoritarianism. He claimed that the Labour Party was pursuing policies of "international socialism", while fascism's aim was "national socialism". It claimed membership as high as 50,000, and had the Daily Mail and Daily Mirror among its earliest supporters. The Mirror piece was a guest article by the Daily Mail owner Viscount Rothermere and an apparent one-off; despite these briefly warm words for the BUF, the paper was so vitriolic in its condemnation of European fascism that Nazi Germany added the paper's directors to a hit list in the event of a successful Operation Sea Lion. The Mail continued to support the BUF until the Olympia rally in June 1934.

Mosley's supporters at this time included the novelist Henry Williamson, the military theorist J. F. C. Fuller, and the future "Lord Haw Haw", William Joyce.

Mosley had found problems with disruption of New Party meetings, and instituted a corps of black-uniformed paramilitary stewards, the "Blackshirts", like the Italian fascist Voluntary Militia for National Security they were emulating. The party was frequently involved in violent confrontations and riots, particularly with communist and Jewish groups and especially in London. At a large Mosley rally at Olympia on 7 June 1934, his bodyguards' violence caused bad publicity. This and the Night of the Long Knives in Germany led to the loss of most of the BUF's mass support. Nevertheless, Mosley continued espousing antisemitism. At one of his New Party meetings in Leicester in April 1935, he said, "For the first time I openly and publicly challenge the Jewish interests of this country, commanding commerce, commanding the Press, commanding the cinema, dominating the City of London, killing industry with their sweat-shops. These great interests are not intimidating, and will not intimidate, the Fascist movement of the modern age." The party was unable to fight the 1935 general election.

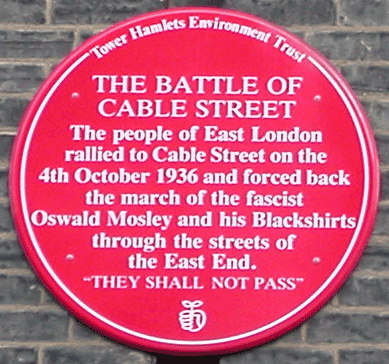
Plaque commemorating the Battle of Cable Street

In October 1936, Mosley and the BUF tried to march through an East London area with a high proportion of Jewish residents. Violence, now called the Battle of Cable Street, resulted between protesters trying to block the march and police trying to force it through. Sir Philip Game, the police commissioner, stopped the march from proceeding and the BUF abandoned it.

Mosley continued to organise marches policed by the Blackshirts, and the government was sufficiently concerned to pass the Public Order Act 1936, which came into effect on 1 January 1937 and, amongst other things, banned political uniforms and quasi-military style organisations. In the London County Council elections in 1937, the BUF stood in three wards in East London (some former New Party seats), its strongest areas, polling up to a quarter of the vote. Mosley made most of the Blackshirt employees redundant, some of whom then defected from the party with William Joyce.

In October 1937 in Liverpool, he was knocked unconscious by two stones thrown by crowd members after he made a fascist salute to 8,000 people from the top of a van in Walton.

As the European situation moved towards war, the BUF began to nominate parliamentary by-election candidates and launched campaigns on the theme of "Mind Britain's Business". Mosley remained popular as late as summer 1939. His "Britain First" rally at the Earls Court Exhibition Hall on 16 July 1939 was the biggest indoor political rally in British history, with a reported 30,000 attendees.

After the outbreak of war, Mosley led the campaign for a negotiated peace, but after the Fall of France and the start of aerial bombardment during the Battle of Britain overall public opinion of him became hostile. In mid-May 1940, he was nearly wounded by an assault.

=== Marriage to Diana Mitford ===
Cynthia died of peritonitis in 1933, after which Mosley married his mistress Diana Guinness, née Mitford (1910–2003). They married in secret in Nazi Germany on 6 October 1936 in the Berlin home of Germany's Minister of Public Enlightenment and Propaganda Joseph Goebbels. Adolf Hitler was their guest of honour, and gave as a wedding gift a framed photo of himself.

Mosley spent large amounts of his private fortune on the BUF and tried to establish it on a firm financial footing by various means including an attempt to negotiate, through Diana, with Hitler for permission to broadcast commercial radio to Britain from Germany. Mosley reportedly made a deal in 1937 with Francis Beaumont, heir to the Seigneurage of Sark, to set up a privately owned radio station on Sark. (Note: Amato 2002, pp. 278–279, quotes national archive document HO 283/11, which states that among the property seized following Mosley's arrest by the British government in 1940 was correspondence between Mosley and Beaumont dating from 1937.)

=== Involvement in fascist plot ===
In 1939, MI5 uncovered Mosley's ties to a fascist conspiracy initiated by Archibald Maule Ramsay and the Right Club, known as the Kensington Conspiracy. The coup would have taken place after the German invasion of Britain.

== Internment ==
Mosley did not know that MI5 and Special Branch had deeply penetrated the BUF and were also monitoring him through listening devices. Beginning in 1934, they were increasingly worried that Mosley's noted oratory skills would convince the public to provide financial support to the BUF, enabling it to challenge the political establishment. American journalist and writer John Gunther described Mosley in 1940 as "strikingly handsome. He is probably the best orator in England. His personal magnetism is very great". Mosley's agitation was officially tolerated until the events of the Battle of France in May 1940 made the government consider him too dangerous. Mosley, who at that time was focused on pleading for the British to accept Hitler's peace offer of October 1939, was detained on 23 May 1940, less than a fortnight after Winston Churchill became prime minister. Mosley was interrogated for 16 hours by Lord Birkett but was never formally charged with a crime, and was instead interned under Defence Regulation 18B. Most other active fascists in Britain met the same fate, resulting in the BUF's practical removal at an organised level from the United Kingdom's political stage. Mosley's wife, Diana, was also interned in June, shortly after the birth of their son Max Mosley; the Mosleys lived together for most of the war in a house in the grounds of Holloway prison. The BUF was proscribed by the British government later that year.

Mosley used the time in confinement to read extensively in classics, particularly regarding politics and war, with a focus upon key historical figures. He refused visits from most BUF members, but on 18 March 1943, Dudley and Norah Elam (who had been released by then) accompanied Unity Mitford to see her sister Diana. Mosley agreed to be present because he mistakenly believed that it was Lady Redesdale, Diana and Unity's mother, who was accompanying Unity. The internment, particularly that of Lady Mosley, resulted in significant public debate in the press, although most of the public supported the government's actions. Others demanded a trial, either in the hope it would end the detention or in the hope of a conviction. During his internment he developed what would become a lifelong friendship with his fellow-prisoner Cahir Healy, a Catholic Irish nationalist MP for the Northern Irish Parliament.

In November 1943, the Home Secretary, Herbert Morrison, ordered the release of the Mosleys. After a fierce debate in the House of Commons, Morrison's action was upheld by a vote of 327–26. Mosley, who was suffering with phlebitis, spent the rest of the war confined under house arrest and police supervision. On his release from prison, he first stayed with his sister-in-law Pamela Mitford, followed shortly by a stay at the Shaven Crown Hotel in Shipton-under-Wychwood. He then purchased Crux Easton House, near Newbury, with Diana. He and his wife remained the subject of much press attention.

== Post-war politics ==
Front cover of My Life

After the Second World War, Mosley was contacted by former supporters and persuaded to return to participation in politics. In 1948 he formed the Union Movement, which called for a single nation-state to cover the continent of Europe (known as Europe a Nation) and in 1962 attempted to launch a National Party of Europe to this end. He had connections with the Italian neo-fascist political party, Movimento Sociale Italiano, and contributed to a weekly Roman magazine, Asso di bastoni (Ace of Clubs, published from 1948 to 1957), which was supported by his Europe a Nation. The New European has described Mosley as an "avowed Europhile". The Union Movement's meetings were often physically disrupted, as Mosley's meetings had been before the war, and largely by the same opponents. This may have contributed to his decision, in 1951, to leave Britain and live in Ireland. (Note: Walsh 2007: "In 1946, through his solicitor, Mosley told officials in Dublin that he was interested in settling in Ireland. De Valera was consulted and Mosley's solicitor was summoned to the Department of Justice to be told that 'the time was perhaps not opportune for him to take up permanent residence and that he might delay his decision for some time until international tempers were quieter'. Five years later with the hostility he encountered in Britain showing no sign of abating, Mosley moved to Ireland.") He responded to criticism of his abandoning his supporters in a hostile Britain for a life abroad by saying, "You don't clear up a dungheap from underneath it." In the 1950s, Mosley advocated that Africa be divided into black and white areas, (Note: Skidelsky 1975, p. 486: "In April 1948, he endorsed a plan by Oswald Pirow, a former South African cabinet minister and founder in 1940 of a pro-Nazi New Order, for dividing Africa into black and white areas.") but the decolonisation of the 1960s put an end to this proposal.

Mosley was a pioneer in the emergence of Holocaust-denial. While not denying the existence of Nazi concentration camps, he claimed that they were a necessity to hold "a considerable disaffected population", where problems were caused by lack of supplies due to "incessant bombing" by the Allies, with bodies burned in gas chambers due to typhus outbreaks, rather than being created by the Nazis to exterminate people. He sought to discredit pictures taken in places like Buchenwald and Belsen. He also claimed that the Holocaust was to be blamed on the Jews and that Adolf Hitler knew nothing about it. He criticised the Nuremberg trials as "a zoo and a peep show".

In the wake of the 1958 Notting Hill race riots, Mosley briefly returned to Britain to stand in the 1959 general election at Kensington North. He led his campaign stridently on an anti-immigration platform, calling for forced repatriation of Caribbean immigrants as well as a prohibition upon mixed marriages. Mosley's final share of the vote, within the Kensington North constituency, was 8.1%. Shortly after his failed election campaign, Mosley permanently moved to Orsay, outside Paris.

In 1961, he took part in a debate at University College London about Commonwealth immigration, seconded by a young David Irving. He returned to politics one last time, contesting the 1966 general election at Shoreditch and Finsbury, and received 4.6% of the vote. After this, he retired and moved back to France, where he wrote his autobiography, My Life (1968). In 1968, he remarked in a letter to The Times, "I am not, and never have been, a man of the right. My position was on the left and is now in the centre of politics."

Mosley's political thought is believed to have influenced some early proponents of the organic farming movement in Great Britain. The agricultural writer and ruralist Henry Williamson put the theories of "blood and soil" into practice, which, in effect, acted as a demonstration farm for Mosley's ideas for the BUF. In The Story of a Norfolk Farm (1941) Williamson recounts the physical and philosophical journey he undertook in turning the farm's worn-out soil back into fertile land. The tone contained in this text is more politically overt than in his nature works. Throughout the book, Williamson makes references to regular meetings he had held with his "Leader" (Mosley) and a group of like-minded agrarian thinkers. Lady Eve Balfour, a founder of the Soil Association, supported Mosley's proposals to abolish Church of England tithes on agricultural land (Mosley's blackshirts protected a number of East Anglian farms in the 1930s from the bailiffs authorised to extract payments to the Church). Jorian Jenks, another early member of the Soil Association, was active within the Blackshirts and served as Mosley's agricultural adviser.

== Personal life ==
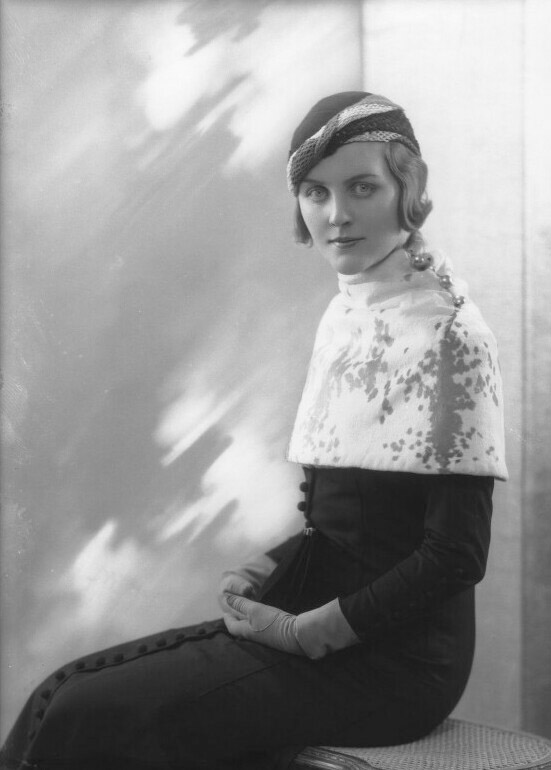
Diana Mitford c. 1932

Mosley had three children with his first wife Lady Cynthia Curzon.

- Vivien Elisabeth Mosley (1921–2002); she married Desmond Francis Forbes Adam (1926–1958) on 15 January 1949. Forbes Adam had been educated at Eton College and at King's College, Cambridge. The couple had two daughters, Cynthia and Arabella, and a son, Rupert. She was a godmother to Queen Camilla.
- Nicholas Mosley (1923–2017; later 3rd Baron Ravensdale, a title inherited from his mother's family), 7th Baronet of Ancoats; he was a novelist and wrote a biography of his father and edited his memoirs for publication.
- Michael Mosley (1932–2012); he was unmarried and without issue.

In 1924, Lady Cynthia joined the Labour Party, and was elected as the Labour MP for Stoke-on-Trent in the 1929 United Kingdom general election. She later joined Oswald's New Party and lost the 1931 election in Stoke. She died in London in 1933 at 34 after an operation for peritonitis following acute appendicitis.

Habitually unfaithful, Mosley would have affairs with friends of his wife as well as Alexandra and Irene Curzon, two of Cynthia's sisters, and with their step-mother Grace Duggan. Others included the actresses Maxine Elliott, Catherine d'Erlanger, Margaret Montagu, Paula Gellibrand, Mary Taviner, Georgia Sitwell, the wife of the writer Sacheverell Sitwell, and the socialite Sylvia Ashley.

Mosley had two children with his second wife, Diana Mitford (1910–2003):

- (Oswald) Alexander Mosley (1938–2005).
- Max Mosley (1940–2021); he was president of the Fédération Internationale de l'Automobile (FIA) for 16 years. In later life, he developed Parkinson's disease.

Since 2022 Mosley's grandson, Louis Mosley, has been head of the UK division of US tech firm Palantir Technologies. His great-grandson, Daniel Mosley, 4th Baron Ravensdale, is a member of the House of Lords who sits as a crossbencher.

== Death and funeral ==
Mosley died on 3 December 1980 at Orsay. His body was cremated in a ceremony held at the Père Lachaise Cemetery, and his ashes were scattered on the pond at Orsay. His son Alexander stated that they had received many messages of condolence but no abusive words. "All that was a very long time ago," he said.

== Coat of arms ==
Coat of arms of Oswald Mosley
Crest An eagle displayed ermine. Escutcheon Sable, a chevron between three pickaxes argent. Motto Mos legem regit. "Custom rules the law".

== Electoral record ==
General election 1966: Shoreditch and Finsbury
Party	Candidate	Votes	%	±%
Labour	Ronald Brown	17,456	71.1	+2.7
Conservative	Roger Sims	5,957	24.3	−7.3
Union Movement	Oswald Mosley	1,126	4.6	New
Majority		11,499	46.9	+10.1
Turnout		24,519	53.5	−2.2
Labour hold		Swing	+5.0	

General election 1959: Kensington, North
Party	Candidate	Votes	%	±%
Labour	George Rogers	14,925	42.8	−11.2
Conservative	Robert Bulbrook	14,048	40.2	−5.8
Liberal	Michael Louis Hydleman	3,118	8.9	New
Union Movement	Oswald Mosley	2,821	8.1	New
Majority		877	2.51	−5.3
Turnout		34,912	67.8	−1.9
Labour hold		Swing	−2.7	

General election 1931: Stoke-on-Trent
Party	Candidate	Votes	%	±%
Conservative	Ida Copeland	19,918	45.6	
Labour	Ellis Smith	13,264	30.3	
New Party	Oswald Mosley	10,534	24.1	New
Majority		6,654	15.2	N/A
Turnout		43,716	75.9	
Conservative gain from Labour		Swing		

General election 1929: Smethwick
Party	Candidate	Votes	%	±%
Labour	Oswald Mosley	19,550	54.8	−2.3
Unionist	Roy Wise	12,210	34.2	+0.5
Liberal	Maude Egerton Marshall	3,909	11.0	+1.8
Majority		7,340	20.6	−2.8
Turnout		35,669	78.9	+0.3
Labour hold		Swing	−1.4	

1926 Smethwick by-election
Party	Candidate	Votes	%	±%
Labour	Oswald Mosley	16,077	57.1	+4.8
Unionist	Marshall James Pike	9,495	33.7	−14.0
Liberal	Edwin Bayliss	2,600	9.2	New
Majority		6,582	23.4	+18.8
Turnout		35,862	78.6	+0.4
Labour hold		Swing	−9.4	

General election 1924: Birmingham Ladywood
Party	Candidate	Votes	%	±%
Unionist	Neville Chamberlain	13,374	49.1	−4.1
Labour	Oswald Mosley	13,297	48.9	+2.1
Liberal	Alfred William Bowkett	539	2.0	New
Majority		77	0.2	−3.8
Turnout		27,200	80.5	+8.5
Unionist hold		Swing	−2.0	

General election 1923: Harrow
Party	Candidate	Votes	%	±%
Independent	Oswald Mosley	14,079	59.9	−6.1
Unionist	Edward Hugh Frederick Morris	9,433	40.1	+6.1
Majority		4,646	19.8	−12.2
Turnout		23,512	64.5	−0.6
Registered electors		36,475		
Independent hold		Swing	−6.1	

General election 1922: Harrow
Party	Candidate	Votes	%	±%
Independent	Oswald Mosley	15,290	66.0	N/A
Unionist	Charles Ward-Jackson	7,868	34.0	−48.3
Majority		7,422	32.0	N/A
Turnout		23,158	65.1	+14.7
Registered electors		35,592		
Independent gain from Unionist		Swing		

General election 1918: Harrow
Party		Candidate	Votes	%	±%
C	Unionist	Oswald Mosley	13,959	82.3	N/A
	Independent	Arthur Robert Chamberlayne	3,007	17.7	New
Majority			10,934	64.6	N/A
Turnout			16,957	50.4	N/A
Registered electors			33,651		
	Unionist hold		Swing	N/A	
C indicates candidate endorsed by the coalition government.

Chamberlayne was nominated by the non-party Harrow Electors League.

== Archive and residences ==
Mosley's personal papers are held at the University of Birmingham's Special Collections Archive.

Mosley's ancestral family residence, Rolleston Hall in Staffordshire, was demolished in 1928. Mosley and his first wife, Cynthia, also lived at Savay Farm, Denham. Immediately following his release in 1943, Mosley lived with his second wife, Diana, at Crux Easton, Hampshire. In 1945 he moved to Crowood Farm, located near Marlborough, Wiltshire, which he ran. In November 1945, Mosley was summoned to court for allegedly causing unnecessary suffering to pigs by failing to provide adequate feeding and accommodation for them. When the decision of the court was announced, Mosley, who had pleaded not guilty, and summoned his own defence, was responsible for an outburst. The hearing lasted for five hours and the charge was dismissed.

Mosley's residence in Fermoy, County Cork, Ireland, was Ileclash House, a Georgian property that had fallen into a state of disrepair until restored by Mosley in the 1950s. In the same decade, he bought and restored Clonfert Palace, also in Ireland.

== In popular culture ==
=== Alternative history fiction ===
- In the Elseworlds comic Superman: War of the Worlds, Mosley becomes prime minister after the defeat of the Martian invasion of 1938.
- In Terrance Dicks' Doctor Who New Adventures novel Timewyrm: Exodus, Prime Minister Mosley is shown addressing Britain's first National Socialist parliament.
- In Kim Newman's The Bloody Red Baron, Mosley is shot down and killed in 1918 by Erich von Stalhein (from the Biggles series by W. E. Johns) and a character later comments that "a career has been ended before it was begun".
- In Philip Roth's The Plot Against America, a secret pact between Charles Lindbergh who has become president of the United States and Hitler includes an agreement to impose Mosley as the ruler of a German-occupied Britain with America's blessing after a ruse in which Lindbergh convinces Churchill to negotiate peace with Hitler, which deliberately fails—mirroring the dishonesty and repudiation of key Hitler-signed treaties, the Munich Conference Accord and Molotov–Ribbentrop Pact.
- In C. J. Sansom's novel Dominion, the Second World War ends in June 1940, when the British government, under the leadership of prime minister Lord Halifax, signs a peace treaty with Nazi Germany in Berlin. By November 1952, Mosley is the home secretary in the cabinet of Lord Beaverbrook, who leads a coalition government consisting of the pro-treaty factions of the Conservatives and Labour as well as the BUF. The government works closely and sympathises with the Nazi regime in Germany. Under Mosley's leadership, the police have become a feared force and an "Auxiliary Police" consisting mainly of British Union of Fascists thugs that has been set up to deal with political crime.
- In Lavie Tidhar's A Man Lies Dreaming (2014), Mosley is running for (and eventually becomes) prime minister, in a world where the Communist Party of Germany, rather than the Nazis, successfully overthrew the Weimar Republic in 1933.
- Mosley appears more than once in the works of Harry Turtledove.
  - The Colonization trilogy sees Mosley, still an MP in 1963, spearheading an effort to pass legislation revoking the citizenship of all Jews; the plan fails in the short term.
  - In the Presence of Mine Enemies (2003) empowers Mosley as British leader in a scenario in which Nazi Germany won the Second World War.
  - In the Southern Victory series, Mosley is the minister of war under prime minister Winston Churchill in an authoritarian and revanchist Britain after the Entente lose the First Great War. Taking power around 1932, the Churchill/Mosley government joins the Kingdom of France and the Russian Empire in attacking the German Empire and the Central Powers in the Second Great War from 1941 to 1944 with disastrous results.
- In Guy Walters' The Leader, Mosley has taken power as "The Leader" of Great Britain in 1937. King Edward VIII is still on the throne after his marriage, Winston Churchill is a prisoner on the Isle of Man, and prime minister Mosley is conspiring with Adolf Hitler about the fate of Britain's Jewish population.
- In the sixth book in Jacqueline Winspear's Maisie Dobbs series, Among the Mad, Maisie's investigation takes her to a meeting of Oswald Mosley followers where violence ensues.
- In the 1944 World War II novel Kaputt by Curzio Malaparte, Mosley appears in an important dream sequence. This happens in chapter IV of the book that is based on the writer's experiences in Moldavia, just before he recounts his first hand experiences of the Iași pogrom.
- In Roy Carter's alternative history novel, The Man Who Prevented WW2, Mosley wins the 1935 election, allies Britain with the Axis powers, abolishes the monarchy and declares war on Ireland and France.
- In the mockumentary It Happened Here (1964), showing a Nazi-occupied Britain in the mid-1940s, Mosley is never mentioned by name. A British fascist leader resembling him is, however, shown in "documentary" footage from the 1930s. Mosley's portrait can be seen alongside Hitler's in government offices. The film's fictional Immediate Action Organisation seems to be inspired by Mosley's British Union of Fascists, with members referred to as "blackshirts" and the symbol of the BUF appearing on their uniforms.

=== Historical and modern-day fiction ===
Film

- In Darkest Hour (2017), Churchill, played by Gary Oldman, discusses with his Outer Cabinet the possibility of Britain becoming a slave state of Nazi Germany under Mosley if the decision is made to pursue peace talks right before his "We Shall Never Surrender" speech.
- In the film Pink Floyd: The Wall (1982), during the "In the Flesh" segment, the character Pink (at this stage in the story, a modern Fascist leader) is dressed in a fashion similar to that of Mosley's.
- In the film The Remains of the Day (1993), the character Sir Geoffrey Wren is based loosely on Sir Oswald Mosley.

Literature

- Amanda K. Hale's novel Mad Hatter (2019) features Mosley as her father James Larratt Battersby's leader in the BUF.
- Aldous Huxley's novel Point Counter Point (1928) features Everard Webley, a character who is similar to Mosley in the 1920s, before Mosley left the Labour Party.
- In H. G. Wells's novel The Holy Terror (1939), the Mosley-like character Lord Horatio Bohun is the leader of an organisation called the Popular Socialist Party. The character is principally motivated by vanity, and is removed from leadership and sent packing to Argentina.
- P. G. Wodehouse's Jeeves short-story and novel series includes the character Roderick Spode from 1938 to 1971, who is a parody of Mosley.
- Dorothy L. Sayers' Lord Peter Wimsey novel finished posthumously by Jill Paton Walsh, Thrones, Dominations, includes a discussion of Mosley's followers between Mary Wimsey and Harriet Vane following the occupation of the Rhineland.

Music

- Originally, Elvis Costello's song "Less Than Zero" (1977) was an attack on Mosley and his politics. Listeners in the United States had assumed that the "Mr. Oswald" in the lyrics was Lee Harvey Oswald, the assassin of John F. Kennedy, so Costello wrote an alternative lyric to refer to him.
- On Mosley's release from prison in 1943, Ewan MacColl wrote the song "The Leader's a Bleeder", set to the tune of the Irish song "The Old Orange Flute". The song suggests that Mosley had been treated relatively well in prison owing to his aristocratic background.

Periodicals

- In 2006, BBC History magazine selected Mosley as the 20th century's worst Briton.

Television

- The Channel 4 biographical series Mosley (1998) starred Jonathan Cake.
- The satirical television programme Not the Nine O'Clock News lampooned the British media's favourable 1980 obituaries of Mosley in a comedic music video, "Baronet Oswald Ernald Mosley". The actors, dressed as Nazi punks, performed a punk rock eulogy to Mosley, interweaving some of the positive remarks by newspapers from all sides of the political spectrum, including The Times and The Guardian.
- The BBC Wales-produced 2010 revival of Upstairs Downstairs, set in 1936, included a storyline involving Mosley, the BUF and the Battle of Cable Street.
- Mosley, played by Sam Claflin, is the primary antagonist in the fifth and sixth series of the BBC crime drama Peaky Blinders.
- Mosley was played by Jonathan McGuinness in the first series of the BBC war drama World on Fire.
- He was portrayed by Joshua Sasse in 2025 British historical drama series Outrageous.

== See also ==
- The European
- Houston Stewart Chamberlain

== Works cited ==
=== Books and journals ===
- Alter, Peter (2017). "Das britische Schwarzhemd". Damals (in German). Vol. 49, no. 4.
- Amato, Joseph Anthony (2002). Rethinking Home: A Case for Writing Local History. Berkeley, California: University of California Press. ISBN 978-0-520-23293-8. Archived from the original on 6 December 2021 – via Google Books.
- Atkin, Nicholas (2009). Themes in Modern European History, 1890–1945. Taylor & Francis. ISBN 978-0-415-39145-0. Archived from the original on 1 May 2016 – via Google Books.
- Barberis, Peter; McHugh, John; Tyldesley, Mike (2005). Encyclopedia of British and Irish Political Organizations. London: Continuum International Publishing Group. p. 194. ISBN 978-0-8264-5814-8. Archived from the original on 26 May 2020 – via Google Books.
- Barnes, James J.; Barnes, Patience P. (2005). Nazis in Pre-War London, 1930–1939: The Fate and Role of German Party Members and British Sympathizers. Brighton: Sussex Academic Press. ISBN 978-1-84519-053-8. Archived from the original on 6 December 2021 – via Google Books.
- Blamires, Cyprian (2006). World Fascism: A–K. ABC-CLIO. pp. 288, 435–. ISBN 978-1-57607-940-9. Archived from the original on 28 February 2021 – via Google Books.
- Bosworth, R. J. B. (1970). "The British Press, the Conservatives, and Mussolini, 1920–34". Journal of Contemporary History. 5 (2): 163–182. doi:10.1177/002200947000500208. S2CID 159457081.
- Cameron, James (1979). Yesterday's Witness. BBC.
- Coupland, Philip M. (19 September 2016). Farming, Fascism and Ecology: A life of Jorian Jenks. Routledge. ISBN 978-1-317-30021-2.
- Craig, Fred W. S. (1983). British Parliamentary Election Results, 1918–1949. Chichester: Parliamentary Research Services. ISBN 0900178019.
- Cross, Colin (1961). The Fascists in Britain. London: Barrie & Rockliff.
- "Disturbances at Fascist Meeting". The Times. No. 48620. London. 20 May 1940. p. 3.
- Edgerton, David (2018). The Rise and Fall of the British Nation: A Twentieth-Century History. Penguin Books Limited. ISBN 978-0-14-197596-2.
- Dorril, Stephen (2006). Blackshirt: Sir Oswald Mosley and British Fascism. Viking Publishing. ISBN 0-670-86999-6.
- Guinness, Jonathan; Guinness, Catherine (1985). The House of Mitford.
- Gunther, John (1940). Inside Europe. New York: Harper & Brothers. pp. 362–364.
- Hartley, Cathy (2003). A Historical Dictionary of British Women. Psychology Press. pp. 325–. ISBN 978-1-85743-228-2. Archived from the original on 14 June 2020 – via Google Books.
- Hobbs, Mark (2017). "The men who rewrite history: Holocaust denial and the British far right from 1967". In Copsey, Nigel; Worley, Matthew (eds.). Tomorrow Belongs to Us: The British Far Right Since 1967. Taylor & Francis. ISBN 9781317190882.
- Jones, Nigel (September 2004). Mosley. Haus Publishing. ISBN 1-904341-09-8.
- Keynes, J. M. (1971). The Collected Writings of John Maynard Keynes: Activities, 1929–1931, Rethinking Employment and Unemployment Policies. Royal Economic Society. pp. 473–475.
- Kidd, Charles; Williamson, David, eds. (2003). Debrett's Peerage and Baronetage (2003 ed.). London: Debrett's & Macmillan Publishers. ISBN 978-0-333-66093-5.
- "Lady Mosley Detained". The Times. No. 48656. London. 1 July 1940. p. 2.
- Layborn, Keith (2002). "Oswald Mosley". Fifty Key Figures in Twentieth Century British Politics. Routledge. ISBN 9780203465455.
- Lindfield, Peter N. (20 April 2023). The Marriage Bed of Henry VII and Elizabeth of York: A Masterpiece of Tudor Craftsmanship. Oxbow Books. ISBN 978-1-78925-794-6 – via Google Books.
- Macklin, Graham (2006). Chamberlain. Haus Books. ISBN 978-1-904950-62-2.
- Macklin, Graham (2020). "Sir Oswald Mosley: From 'Britain First' to 'Europe-a-Nation'". Failed Führers: A History of Britain's Extreme Right. Abingdon-on-Thames: Routledge. ISBN 9780415627306.
- Mammone, Andrea (2011). "Revitalizing and de-territorializing fascism in the 1950s: the extreme right in France and Italy, and the pan-national ('European') imaginary". Patterns of Prejudice. 45 (4): 297. doi:10.1080/0031322X.2011.605842. S2CID 145290608.
- McPherson, Angela; McPherson, Susan (2011). Mosley's Old Suffragette: A Biography of Norah Elam. Lulu.com. ISBN 978-1-4466-9967-6. Archived from the original on 13 January 2012.
- Mosley, Diana (1977). A Life of Contrasts. Hamish Hamilton.
- Mosley, Nicholas (1982). Rules of the Game: Sir Oswald and Lady Cynthia Mosley, 1896–1933. Secker & Warburg. ISBN 978-0-436-28849-4.
- Mosley, Nicholas (1983). Beyond the Pale: Sir Oswald Mosley and Family, 1933–1980. Secker & Warburg. ISBN 978-0-436-28852-4.
- Mosley, Nicholas (1991). Rules of the Game; Beyond the Pale. Dalkey Archives Press. ISBN 9780916583750.
- Mosley, Oswald (1968). My Life. Arlington House. ISBN 978-0-87000-160-4.
- "Mosley for Rector?" (PDF). Leeds Student. 21 October 1977. p. 1.
- Moulton, Mo, ed. (2014), "The postwar international order and the mobilization of public opinion", Ireland and the Irish in Interwar England, Cambridge: Cambridge University Press, pp. 48–101, doi:10.1017/CBO9781107280717.004, ISBN 978-1-107-05268-0
- Mount, Ferdinand (6 July 2006). "Double-Barrelled Dolts". London Review of Books. 28 (13). ISSN 0260-9592.
- Nicolson, Harold (1968). Nicolson, Nigel (ed.). Diaries and Letters: 1930-1939. New York: Atheneum. ISBN 9780002113168.
- Reekes, Andrew. "The 1924 Ladywood Election: Neville Chamberlain faces Oswald Mosley". West Midlands History.
- Rahbaran, Shiva (2006). Paradox of Freedom. Dalkey Archive Press. p. 137. ISBN 9781564784889 – via Google Books.
- Rees, Philip (1990). Biographical Dictionary of the Extreme Right Since 1890. Harvester Wheatsheaf. ISBN 9780710810199.
- Rees, Philip (1979). Fascism in Britain. Harvester Press.
- Rubin, Bret (Autumn 2010). "The Rise and Fall of British Fascism: Sir Oswald Mosley and the British Union of Fascists" (PDF). Intersections Online. 11: 17. Archived (PDF) from the original on 8 November 2020.
- Sanders, David (2019). Authoritarian Populism and Liberal Democracy. Cham, Switzerland: Springer International. pp. 17–18. ISBN 9783030179977.
- Seeger, Peggy (September 2009). The Essential Ewan MacColl Songbook. Minnesota, US: Loomis House Press. pp. 240–241. ISBN 978-1-935243-12-0. Archived from the original on 2 January 2017.
- Sihvonen, Maija (2008). "Modern and Anti-Modern Elements in the Discourse of the British Union of Fascists" (PDF). p. 14. Archived (PDF) from the original on 3 February 2021.
- "Sir Oswald Mosley and the Jews – Communist Scuffle With Police". The Times. No. 47039. London. 15 April 1935. p. 8.
- Skidelsky, Robert (1975). Oswald Mosley. New York City: Holt, Rinehart and Winston. ISBN 9780030865800.
- Skidelsky, Robert (1994). Politicians and the Slump: The Labour Government of 1929–1931. Macmillan. p. 170.
- Skidelsky, Robert (23 September 2004). "Mosley, Sir Oswald Ernald, sixth baronet (1896–1980)". Oxford Dictionary of National Biography (online ed.). Oxford University Press. doi:10.1093/ref:odnb/31477. (Subscription, Wikipedia Library access or UK public library membership required.)
- Skinner, James (30 November 2011). Growing Up in Wartime Uxbridge. The History Press. ISBN 978-0-7524-8014-5.
- Sorlin, Pierre (1991). European Cinemas, European Societies, 1939–1990. Psychology Press. pp. 65–66. ISBN 978-0-415-05671-7. Archived from the original on 1 May 2016 – via Google Books.
- Thompson, Laura (30 September 2015). Take Six Girls: The Lives of the Mitford Sisters. Head of Zeus. ISBN 978-1-78497-088-8.
- Thomson, Graeme (2004). Complicated Shadows: The Life and Music of Elvis Costello. New York: Canongate. ISBN 978-1-84195-796-8.
- Thorpe, Andrew (1997). A History of the British Labour Party. London: Macmillan Education UK. pp. 71–72. doi:10.1007/978-1-349-25305-0. ISBN 978-0-333-56081-5.
- Villis, T. (2013). British Catholics and Fascism: Religious Identity and Political Extremism Between the Wars. Springer. ISBN 978-1-137-27419-9.
- Walsh, Maurice (Spring 2007). "Mosley in Ireland". The Dublin Review (26). Archived from the original on 31 October 2021.
- Walsh, Maurice (2015). Bitter Freedom: Ireland In A Revolutionary World 1918–1923. Faber & Faber. ISBN 978-0-571-27197-9.
- Webb, Beatrice (1982). Mackenzie, Norman; Mackenzie, Jeanne (eds.). The Diaries of Beatrice Webb. London: Virago. pp. 414–415.
- "Who was Peaky Blinders Villain Sir Oswald Mosley?". Debrett's. 27 February 2022.
- Worley, Matthew (2010). Oswald Mosley and the New Party. Springer. ISBN 978-0-230-27652-9.
- Worley, Matthew (January 2011) [22 December 2010]. "Why Fascism? Sir Oswald Mosley and the Conception of the British Union of Fascists". History. 96 (1 (321)): 72. doi:10.1111/j.1468-229X.2010.00507.x. ISSN 0018-2648. JSTOR 24429007.

=== News ===
- Adebowale, Temi (12 October 2019). "The True Story of 'Peaky Blinders' Character Oswald Mosley". Men's Health.
- Andrew, Steve (15 March 2017). "Green fascism? Bio shows surprising roots of organic farming movement". People's World.
- Barker, Revel (20 July 2010). "Darkness in the mirror". The Express Tribune. Archived from the original on 18 May 2015.
- Bona, Emilia (13 September 2020). "How Liverpool ran a fascist leader out of town and showed what our city stands for". Liverpool Echo. Archived from the original on 19 October 2021.
- Barling, Kurt (4 October 2011). "Why remember Battle of Cable Street?". BBC News.
- Browne, Bill (5 May 2011). "Fascist Oswald Mosley's house in Fermoy up for sale". The Irish Independent. Archived from the original on 29 October 2021.
- Gould, Mark (22 February 2009). "Last reunion for war heroes who came home to fight the fascists". The Independent. Archived from the original on 29 July 2017.
- Horrie, Chris (11 November 2003). "Revealed: the fascist past of the Daily Mirror". The Independent. Archived from the original on 5 April 2008.
- Dowd, Maureen (11 June 2000). "Tea With Hitler". The New York Times. Archived from the original on 23 March 2016.
- Hourican, Emily (18 July 2021). "How the Mitford sisters' flight from fascism took them to Ireland". The Irish Independent. Archived from the original on 29 October 2021.
- Jones, Charlotte (20 December 2013). "The Code of Woosters, by PG Wodehouse: Splendid, Jeeves!". The Guardian. London. Archived from the original on 19 October 2016.
- Mance, Henry (23 July 2018). "John Major looked to fascist Oswald Mosley for ideas on economy". Financial Times.
- Martin, Rose (28 April 2018). "House of the week: Perfectly restored, pristine period house in Fermoy". Irish Examiner. Archived from the original on 29 October 2021.
- Meleady, Sean (4 November 2021). "Britain's post-war fascist pro-Europeans". The New European.
- Negus, Richard (27 July 2022). "Blood and soil: the Greens' fascist roots". The Critic.
- Nolan, Amy (30 January 2020). "Take a look at this incredible Cork mansion on the market for €2.75m". Echo Live. Archived from the original on 21 October 2021.
- Philpot, Robert (15 September 2018). "The true history behind London's much-lauded anti-fascist Battle of Cable Street". Times of Israel.
- Philpot, Robert (20 March 2021). "Holocaust denial was already taking root in Britain during WWII, says UK author". Times of Israel. Archived from the original on 10 July 2021.
- Robinson, Abby (27 August 2019). "Peaky Blinders' Oswald Mosley – the real story behind Tommy Shelby's new foe". Digital Spy. Hearst UK Entertainment. Archived from the original on 11 December 2019.
- Scanlon, Eoin (21 April 2016). "€3.5 million Ileclash House for sale along River Blackwater". The Avondhu. Archived from the original on 24 October 2021.
- "The meteoric rise and fall of a controversial politician". The Times. No. 66377. London. 5 December 1998. p. 36[S].
- "Who was Sir Oswald Mosley?". BBC News. 26 August 2019. Archived from the original on 4 September 2020.
- "'Worst' historical Britons list". BBC News. Archived from the original on 27 May 2018.

=== Websites and others ===
- Morris M. (16 June 2023). "Oswald Mosley: Hitler's Man in Britain". Biographics.
- "Ten things you didn't know about Mr Keynes". Evening Standard. 13 April 2012.
- "UK General Election results October 1959". Politics Science Resources. Archived from the original on 11 August 2011.
- "Understanding Historic Parks and Gardens in Buckinghamshire" (PDF). Buckinghamshire Gardens Trust. 16 March 2017.

Parliament of the United Kingdom
Preceded by Harry Deeley	Member of Parliament for Harrow; 1918–1924	Succeeded by Isidore Salmon
Preceded by John Davison	Member of Parliament for Smethwick; 1926–1931	Succeeded by Roy Wise
Political offices
Preceded by The Lord Cushendun	Chancellor of the Duchy of Lancaster; 1929–1930	Succeeded by Clement Attlee
Baronetage of Great Britain
Preceded by Oswald Mosley	Baronet of Ancoats; 1928–1980	Succeeded by Nicholas Mosley
