= Sykes baronets of Basildon (1781) =

Escutcheon of the Sykes baronets of Basildon

The Sykes baronetcy, of Basildon in the County of Berkshire, was created in the Baronetage of Great Britain on 10 June 1785 for the nabob, diplomat and politician Francis Sykes. He was a Member of Parliament for Shaftesbury and Wallingford.

The 2nd Baronet sat as Member of Parliament for Wallingford from 1794 to 1796.

== Sykes baronets, of Basildon (1781) ==
- Sir Francis Sykes, 1st Baronet (1732–1804)
- Sir Francis William Sykes, 2nd Baronet (c. 1767–1804)ref name="HoP2"/>
- Sir Francis William Sykes, 3rd Baronet (1799–1843)
- Sir Francis William Sykes, 4th Baronet (1822–1866)
- Sir Frederick Henry Sykes, 5th Baronet (1826–1899)
- Sir Henry Sykes, 6th Baronet (1828–1916)
- Sir Arthur Sykes, 7th Baronet (1871–1934)
- Sir Frederic John Sykes, 8th Baronet (1876–1956)
- Sir Francis Godfrey Sykes, 9th Baronet (1907–1990)
- Sir Francis John Badcock Sykes, 10th Baronet (1942–2020)
- Sir Francis Charles Sykes, 11th Baronet, born 18 June 1968.

The heir presumptive to the title is the 11th Baronet's brother Edward William Sykes (born 1970).

== Notes ==
Baronetage of Great Britain
Preceded by Craufurd baronets	Sykes baronets of Basildon; 8 June 1781	Succeeded by Mosley baronets
