= My Life (Mosley autobiography) =

Autobiography of Oswald Mosley

- Author: Oswald Mosley
- Language: English
- Genre: Autobiography
- Publisher: Nelson
- Publication date: 1968
- Publication place: United Kingdom
- Media type: Print (hardback & paperback)
- Pages: 521
- ISBN: 0-17-142009-8
- OCLC: 245659224

My Life is the autobiography of the British Fascist leader Sir Oswald Mosley (1896 – 1980). It was published in 1968.

== Background ==
Oswald Mosley was a British politician who served as a member of parliament under both the Conservative and Labour parties, and was appointed a minister by Ramsay MacDonald in 1929 before ultimately leaving the Labour party in protest of its economic policies. In 1931 he created his own fascist political party called the New Party, which became the British Union of Fascists in 1932. His turn to fascism was widely considered to be political suicide, and he never held political office again.

== Release ==
The book was published in 1968. To coincide with the release of the book, the BBC broadcast a Panorama special, seen by a record audience.

== Content ==
The book is structured as a sequential memoir, but it doubles as the author's personal defence against charges of antisemitism, as well as a general overview of world politics, both during his ascent, and at the time of its publication in the 1960s.

My Life provides Mosley's justifications for his actions and his claims that he was surprised by the violence his party engaged in, which he claims to have not endorsed. He defends the methods of fascist dictator Benito Mussolini but condemns the Holocaust. However, he argues that Adolf Hitler was not responsible for the Holocaust, and that it was brought about by nations going to war against him rather than accommodating his fascist ideology.
