= Sir Tonman Mosley, 3rd Baronet =

English aristocrat, baronet and military officer

Sir Tonman Mosley, 3rd Baronet, DL (1813–1890), was an English aristocrat, baronet and military officer in the Inniskilling Dragoons. He was a prominent Staffordshire landholder.

== Early life ==
Sir Tonman Mosley was born on 9 July 1813 at Rolleston Hall, Rolleston-on-Dove, Staffordshire, to Sir Oswald Mosley, 2nd Baronet, and Sophia Anne Every (died 1859), daughter of Sir Edward Every, 8th Baronet (1754–1786), and Mary Mosley (died 1826).

== Career ==
Mosley served in the 6th (Inniskilling) Dragoons in Ireland.

He succeeded his father as 3rd Baronet Mosley, of Ancoats, in 1871. He held the office of Deputy lieutenant for Staffordshire.

== Progeny and legacy ==
In 1847 Sir Tonman married Catherine Wood, a daughter of Rev. John Wood (died 1858), of Swanwick Hall, Swanwick, Derbyshire, and Emily Susanna Bellairs, eldest daughter of Abel Walford Bellairs, Esq. (1755–1839). They had the following issue:

- Oswald Mosley (1848–1915), who succeeded in the baronetcy
- Tonman Mosley (1850–1933), created Baron Anslow in 1915 but died without surviving male issue
- Ernald Mosley (1851–1933)

He died on 28 April 1890 at his residence of Rolleston Hall. He was succeeded in the baronetcy by his eldest son Oswald, who became the 4th Baronet and was the grandfather of fascist leader Oswald Mosley.

Baronetage of Great Britain
Preceded by Oswald Mosley	Baronet of Ancoats; 1871–1890	Succeeded by Oswald Mosley
