= Sir Oswald Mosley, 5th Baronet =

Father of Oswald Mosley

Sir Oswald Mosley Bt
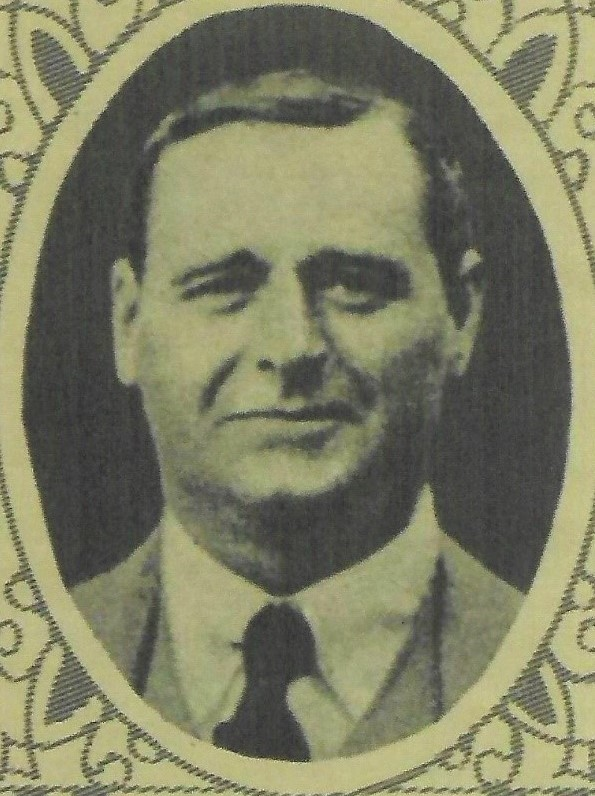

Personal details
- Born: 29 December 1873 Beaumaris, Anglesey, Wales
- Died: 21 September 1928 (aged 54) Hilton, Derbyshire, England
- Resting place: St. Mary’s Church, Rolleston-on-Dove
- Spouse: Maud Edwards-Heathcote (m. 1895)
- Children: 3, including Oswald
- Parent(s): Sir Oswald Mosley, 4th Baronet; Elizabeth Constance White

Military service
- Allegiance: United Kingdom
- Branch/service: British Army
- Rank: Captain
- Unit: Derbyshire Yeomanry
- Battles/wars: World War I

Sir Oswald Mosley, 5th Baronet (29 December 1873 – 21 September 1928), was a British Army officer, aristocrat and the father of Oswald Mosley, leader of the British Union of Fascists (BUF).

== Biography ==
Born on 29 December 1873 at Fryers House, near Beaumaris, Anglesey, he was the only son of Sir Oswald Mosley, 4th Baronet, of Rolleston Hall, Rolleston-on-Dove, Staffordshire, and Elizabeth Constance, Lady Mosley (née White), daughter of Sir William White. He gained the rank of Captain in the 1/1st Derbyshire Yeomanry and served in Egypt during the First World War until invalided in 1916. He succeeded his father as 5th Baronet Mosley, of Ancoats (1781, BGB), in 1915.

Mosley became estranged from both his wife and his father, the latter describing him as a "gloomy blackguard". His wife's family, the Heathcotes, thought of him as an "ogre".

His interests were in shooting, boxing, motoring and racing.

He died at his residence, Hilton Lodge, near Derby, on 21 September 1928. His will was proven by probate at the Derby District Registry; his estate valued at £5000, which he left to his ageing mother and sister. He was succeeded in the baronetcy by his eldest son Oswald.

== Family ==
On 12 December 1895, Mosley married Katharine Maud Edwards-Heathcote (1873–1948), the daughter of Capt. Justinian Edwards-Heathcote, of Apedale Hall. She belonged to the wealthy Staffordshire Heathcote family, who held significant property around Newcastle-under-Lyme and Stoke-on-Trent. Their marriage was an unhappy one. Nonetheless, it produced three sons:

- Sir Oswald Ernald Mosley, 6th Baronet (16 November 1896 – 3 December 1980), married firstly Lady Cynthia Curzon, the daughter of Lord Curzon, with issue; and secondly the Hon. Diana Mitford, the daughter of Lord Redesdale, with issue.
- Maj. Edward Heathcote Mosley (25 April 1899 – 1980).
- John Arthur Noel Mosley (12 December 1901 – 14 March 1973)

== Arms ==
Coat of arms of Sir Oswald Mosley, 5th Baronet
Crest An eagle displayed ermine. Escutcheon Sable, a chevron between three pickaxes argent. Motto Mos legem regit. "Custom rules the law".

== See also ==
- Mosley baronets
- Oswald Mosley

Baronetage of Great Britain
Preceded by Oswald Mosley	Baronet of Ancoats; 1915–1928	Succeeded by Oswald Mosley
