= Craufurd baronets =

Title in the Baronetage of Great Britain

- Escutcheon of the Craufurd baronets of Kilbirney
- Creation date: 1781
- Status: extinct
- Extinction date: 8 October 2026
- Motto: Sine labe nota, Distinction without a stain

The Craufurd baronetcy, of Kilbirney in south-west Scotland ("North Britain" in the terminology of the time), was a title in the Baronetage of Great Britain. It was created on 8 June 1781 for Alexander Craufurd, a member of an ancient Scottish family. The 2nd Baronet was a diplomat.

== Craufurd baronets, of Kilbirney (1781) ==
- Sir Alexander Craufurd, 1st Baronet (c. 1729–1797)
- Sir James Gregan-Craufurd, 2nd Baronet (1761–1839)
- Sir George William Craufurd, 3rd Baronet (1797–1881)
- Sir Charles William Frederick Craufurd, 4th Baronet (1847–1939)
- Sir George Standish Gage Craufurd, 5th Baronet (1872–1957)
- Sir Quentin Charles Alexander Craufurd, 6th Baronet (1875–1957)
- Sir Alexander John Fortescue Craufurd, 7th Baronet (1876–1966)
- Sir James Gregan Craufurd, 8th Baronet (1886–1970)
- Sir Robert James Craufurd, 9th Baronet (1937–2026)

The 9th Baronet had three children, all daughters and there was no heir to this baronetcy.

== Extended family ==
Two younger sons of the 1st Baronet, Charles Craufurd and Robert Craufurd, were generals in the British Army, and elected for East Retford in the House of Commons.

== Notes ==
Baronetage of Great Britain
Preceded by Ingilby baronets	Craufurd baronets of Kilbirney; 8 June 1781	Succeeded by Sykes baronets
