= Mosley baronets of Rolleston (1st creation, 1640) =

Escutcheon of the Mosley baronets of Rolleston

The Mosley baronetcy, of Rolleston in the County of Stafford, was created in the Baronetage of England on 10 July 1640 for Edward Mosley, of Rolleston Hall. He was a son of Rowland Mosley (1558–1616), and grandson of Sir Nicholas Mosley of Hough End Hall (who acquired the Manor of Manchester in 1596 and was Lord Mayor of London in 1599), and nephew of the lawyer and politician Sir Edward Mosley He had been knighted by King James I of England in 1614; appointed a justice of the peace and Attorney-General for the Duchy of Lancaster; and elected as a Member of Parliament for Preston in 1614, 1620–1622, and 1624–1625. He inherited the estates of his uncle Sir Edward Mosley.

A Royalist who was High Sheriff of Staffordshire, Mosley was taken prisoner in 1643 at the First Battle of Middlewich. Then subjected to heavy financial penalties, he lived out his life with money troubles and debt.

The 2nd Baronet sat as Member of Parliament for St Michael from 1661 to 1665. The baronetcy became extinct on his death in 1665.

== Mosley baronets, of Rolleston (1640) ==
- Sir Edward Mosley, 1st Baronet (1616–1657)
- Sir Edward Mosley, 2nd Baronet (c. 1637–1665)
