= Mosley baronets of Rolleston (2nd creation, 1720) =

Escutcheon of the Mosley baronets of Rolleston

The Mosley baronetcy, of Rolleston in the County of Stafford, was created in the Baronetage of Great Britain on 18 June 1720 for Oswald Mosley, son of Oswald Mosley of Ancoats and Rolleston, and High Sheriff of Staffordshire in 1714. He was distantly related to the 2nd Baronet of the 1640 creation. The title became extinct on the death of the 3rd Baronet in 1779.

== Mosley baronets, of Rolleston (1720) ==
- Sir Oswald Mosley, 1st Baronet (1674–1751)
- Sir Oswald Mosley, 2nd Baronet (1705–1757)
- Sir John Mosley, 3rd Baronet (died 1779). A cleric, he died unmarried.

== Notes ==
Baronetage of Great Britain
Preceded by Blunt baronets	Mosley baronets of Rolleston; 18 June 1720	Succeeded by Colby baronets
