= Peter Alter =

German historian (born 1940)

Peter Alter (born 22 July 1940 in Parchim) is emeritus professor of modern and contemporary history at the University of Duisburg-Essen, Germany, and a specialist in nationalism and the twentieth century history of the United Kingdom. He is a former research fellow and deputy director of the German Historical Institute London.

== Selected publications ==
=== English language ===
- The reluctant patron. Science and the state in Britain, 1850–1920. Berg, Oxford, Hamburg 1987, ISBN 0-907582-67-2.
- Nationalism. Arnold, London 1989, ISBN 0-7131-6519-7.
- Out of the Third Reich: Refugee historians in post-war Britain. Tauris, New York, London 1998, ISBN 1-86064-189-X (Ed.)
- The German question and Europe. A history. Arnold, London 2000, ISBN 0-340-54017-6.

=== German language ===
- Die irische Nationalbewegung zwischen Parlament und Revolution. Der konstitutionelle Nationalismus in Irland 1880–1918, Oldenbourg, München, Wien 1971 (zugleich: Universität Köln, phil. Diss., 1970), ISBN 978-3-486-43431-6.
- Gesellschaft und Demokratie in Nordirland, Klett, Stuttgart 1974, ISBN 978-3-12-429200-1.
- Der Imperialismus. Grundlagen, Probleme, Theorien, Klett, Stuttgart 1979, ISBN 978-3-12-421910-7.
- Winston Churchill (1874–1965). Leben und Überleben, Kohlhammer Verlag, Stuttgart 2006, ISBN 978-3-17-018786-3.
- Die Windsors. Geschichte einer Dynastie, Beck, München 2009, ISBN 978-3-406-56261-7.
- Nationalismus. Ein Essay über Europa. Alfred Körner Verlag, Stuttgart 2016, ISBN 978-3-520-71301-8, 190 S.
