= Tonman Mosley, 1st Baron Anslow =

British businessman, judge and politician (1850–1933)

The Right Honourable The Lord Anslow CB KStJ DL
- Tonman Mosley, ca. 1900

Chairman of the Buckinghamshire County Council
- In office 1904–1921
- Preceded by: The Lord Cottesloe
- Succeeded by: Sir Leonard West

Personal details
- Born: Tonman Mosley; 16 January 1850 Burton upon Trent, Staffordshire, England
- Died: 20 August 1933 (aged 83) Iver, Buckinghamshire, England
- Party: Conservative
- Spouse: Lady Hilda Rose Montgomerie (m. 1881)
- Relations: The Earl of Eglinton (father-in-law)
- Parent(s): Sir Tonman Mosley, Bt; Catherine Wood

Tonman Mosley, 1st Baron Anslow, CB, KStJ, DL (16 January 1850 – 20 August 1933), was a British Conservative politician, businessman and judge. He was chairman of the Buckinghamshire County Council from 1904 until 1921 and chairman of the North Staffordshire Railway company from 1904 until 1923.

== Family ==
Tonman Mosley was born at East Lodge, Anslow, Burton upon Trent, Staffordshire, and baptized at Rolleston-on-Dove, Staffordshire, the younger son of Sir Tonman Mosley, 3rd Baronet, of Ancoats, and his wife Catherine Wood (died 22 April 1891), daughter of The Reverend John Wood of Swanwick Hall, Derbyshire, and Emily Susanna Bellairs, daughter of Abel Walford Bellairs. (See Mosley baronets for earlier history of the family.)

His elder brother Sir Oswald Mosley, 4th Baronet, of Ancoats, was the grandfather of fascist leader Sir Oswald Mosley, 6th Baronet. Mosley's family were prosperous landowners in Staffordshire.

== Career ==
He was educated at Repton School, Repton, Derbyshire, between 1862 and 1868, and at Corpus Christi College, Oxford, between 1868 and 1871 and graduated from the University of Oxford in 1872 with a Bachelor of Arts degree. He was called to the Bar at Inner Temple in 1874 entitled to practice as a barrister-at-law.

Anslow unsuccessfully contested the Lichfield Division of Staffordshire as a Conservative in the 1885 general election. In 1897 he was appointed Chairman of the Quarter Sessions of Derbyshire, a post he held until 1902, and served as Chairman of the Buckinghamshire County Council from 1904 to 1921. Between 1904 and 1923 he was also Chairman of the North Staffordshire Railway Company. In 1914 Anslow contested the Wycombe Division of Buckinghamshire as a Liberal, but was once again unsuccessful. He also served as a Deputy Lieutenant of Buckinghamshire and Staffordshire.

He was appointed a Companion of the Order of the Bath in 1911 and on 28 June 1916 he was raised to the peerage as Baron Anslow, of Iver, in the County of Buckingham, in the Peerage of the United Kingdom. He was also a Knight of Grace of the Venerable Order of Saint John.

== Marriage and issue ==
Lord Anslow married on 22 February 1881 at St Peter's Church, Eaton Square, Belgravia, London, Lady Hilda Rose Montgomerie, daughter of Archibald Montgomerie, 13th Earl of Eglinton, and his wife, Adela Caroline Harriett (née Capell), Countess of Eglinton, daughter of Arthur Capell, 6th Earl of Essex. They had two sons and two daughters:

- Captain Hon. Nicholas Mosley (28 July 1882 – 1 August 1915), died without issue on the Western Front in World War I. He had fought in the Second Boer War between 1900 and 1902 and in World War I between 1914 and 1915 in the service of the North Staffordshire Regiment
- Hon. Edward Hugh Mosley (16 July 1884 – 16 July 1910), died without issue
- Hon. Mildred Mosley (9 June 1887 – 1 January 1963)
- Hon. Sybil Hildegarde Mosley (14 January 1896 – 7 July 1962)

Both Lord Anslow's sons predeceased him. Lady Anslow died at Bangors, Iver, Buckinghamshire, on 18 June 1928. Lord Anslow survived her by five years and died in August 1933, aged 83, without surviving male issue, when the barony became extinct. His burial was a cremation at Woking, Surrey, on 24 August 1933.

== Arms ==
Coat of arms of Tonman Mosley, 1st Baron Anslow
Crest An Eagle displayed Ermine Escutcheon Sable a Chevron between three Pickaxes Argent Supporters Dexter: A Stork proper charged with a Stafford Knot Or; Sinister: A Swan wings inverted also proper gorged with an Antique Crown Gold Motto Mos Legem Regit

Government offices
Preceded by The Lord Cottesloe	Chairman of the Buckinghamshire County Council; 1904–1921	Succeeded by Sir Leonard West
Peerage of the United Kingdom
New creation	Baron Anslow; 1916–1933	Extinct
