= Sir John Mosley, 1st Baronet =

English landowner (1732–1798)

The Right Honourable Sir John Mosley

Personal details
- Born: 22 February 1732 Ancoats Hall
- Died: 1798 (aged 65–66)
- Spouse: Elizabeth Bayley

Sir John Parker Mosley, 1st Baronet of Ancoats (22 February 1732 – 1798), was an English landowner and baronet.

He was born at Ancoats Hall on 22 February 1732 to Nicholas Mosley, Esq., of Ancoats, and Elizabeth Parker. The Mosleys were an old and distinguished Manchester family with medieval origins in Staffordshire. His father died in 1734, and he was adopted by Sir Oswald Mosley, 2nd Baronet, of Rolleston (1705–1757), his second cousin and godfather.

Mosley worked as a hatter and had a profitable business in that trade. In 1779, as per the will of his adoptive father, he inherited the estates of Rev. Sir John Mosley, 3rd Baronet, of Rolleston, which included Rolleston Hall and extensive lands in Staffordshire. On 24 March 1781, he was himself created a baronet in the Baronetage of Great Britain by George III. He served as High Sheriff of Lancashire in 1786.

Mosley married Elizabeth Bayley, daughter of James Bayley and Anne Peploe, daughter of the Rt. Rev. Samuel Peploe. He was succeeded in the baronetcy by his grandson Sir Oswald Mosley, 2nd Baronet.

== See also ==
- Mosley baronets

Baronetage of England
New creation	Baronet of Ancoats; 1781–1798	Succeeded by Oswald Mosley
