= Nicholas Mosley (mayor) =

English merchant and politician

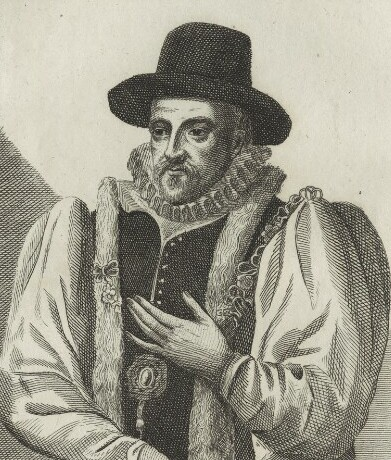
1797 engraving of Mosley

Sir Nicholas Mosley (c. 1527 – 12 December 1612) was an English merchant and politician who served as the Lord Mayor of London in 1599.

Nicholas Mosley was born in or near Manchester in c. 1527, supposedly the eldest son of Edward Moseley and his wife Margaret Moseley (née Elcock). With his younger brothers, Oswald (1534-1621), Francis (1535-1570), and Anthonie (1537-1607), he appears to have initiated what became a highly successful business as a woolen manufacturer and merchant.

By the early 1550s, Mosley had moved from Manchester to London as a step in the expansion of the business. Mosley went on to become a city of London merchant and a member of the Worshipful Company of Clothworkers.

In London (on 20 February 1553) Mosley married Margery Whitbroke at All Hallows, Honey Lane, in the City of London. They were to have a total of nine known children, of whom the youngest, Edward, became a highly successful barrister, was knighted by King James I in 1614; was appointed a justice of the peace and Attorney-General for the Duchy of Lancaster; was elected as an MP for Preston in 1614, 1620–2, and 1624–5; and was the Mosley who first acquired the estates at Rolleston on Dove, in Staffordshire, held by the Mosley family for 400 years from the early 1600s until the 20th century (see below).

Between the early 1560s and the mid to late 1570s, Mosley returned to the Manchester area (where five of his children were baptized at St James' Chapel, Didsbury, between 1562 and 1568). However, after the death of his brother Francis in c. 1570–71, Mosley returned to London to manage the commercial end of the family business.

In 1589 Mosley was elected an alderman of the City of London for Aldersgate ward. In 1591 he was a Sheriff of London. In 1592 (following the death of his first wife) he married the widow Elizabeth Hendley (née Rookes) at All Hallows, Bread Street in the City of London. He moved to become alderman for Langbourn ward in 1594, remaining until 1602. In 1596, he bought the manor of Manchester and the same year began to build Hough End Hall at Chorlton-cum-Hardy, Withington. In 1599, he was elected Lord Mayor of London. His mayoralty was notable for the fact that there was a significant threat of Spanish invasion during that year, and Mosley was required to raise funds and forces for the defense of London. He was knighted by Queen Elizabeth I between 15 March – 2 July 1600. He was High Sheriff of Lancashire from 1609 to 1610.

Mosley was responsible for formalizing the spelling of the family name as "Mosley" when, in 1592, he sought and obtained "the grant of a crest to be borne with his paternal arms, the same being duly entered and then enrolled in the Heralds' College." The text further states that, "It became a fashionable practice in the reign of Queen Elizabeth [I] to assume some motto bearing a quaint allusion to the family name, and in conformity with [this fashion], as well as out of compliment to his youngest son, Edward, who was just then rising to eminence in his profession as a barrister, Sir Nicholas adopted the Latin words, 'Mos legem regit' ('Custom, or precedent, rules the law')."

Mosley died in 1612 and was buried in the Church of St James, Didsbury, where a monument shows him kneeling, "dressed in the robes of the Lord Mayor of London". In his will, he left £100 to employ a schoolmaster at a salary of £5 a year for 20 years after his death.

The Mosley baronetcy, of Rolleston, Staffordshire, was created in 1640 in the Baronetage of England for Mosley's grandson Sir Edward Mosley, 1st Baronet, of Rolleston Hall.

Civic offices
| Preceded by Richard Gurney; Stephen Soame | Sheriffs of the City of London; 1591–1592; With: Robert Broke | Succeeded by Benedict Barnham; William Ryder |
| Preceded by Stephen Soame | Lord Mayor of London; 1599 | Succeeded by William Ryder |
