= Sir Oswald Mosley, 4th Baronet =

British baronet and landowner

Sir Oswald Mosley, 4th Baronet (25 September 1848 – 10 October 1915), was a British baronet and landowner.

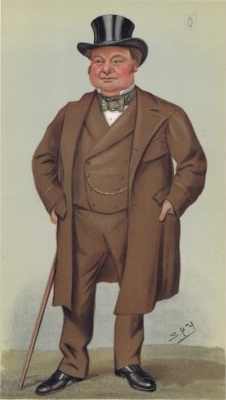
"John Bull" Mosley as caricatured by "Spy" (Leslie Ward) in Vanity Fair, September 1898.

== Family ==
Mosley was born in Staffordshire in 1848 the eldest son of Sir Tonman Mosley, 3rd Baronet (9 July 1813 – 28 April 1890), who succeeded to the title of Baronet Mosley, of Ancoats in 1871, and his wife Catherine Wood (died 1891), daughter of Rev. John Wood, of Swanwick, Derbyshire, and Emily Susanna Bellairs (daughter of Abel Bellairs and Susannah Lowley). His younger brother was Tonman Mosley, 1st Baron Anslow. His paternal grandparents were Sir Oswald Mosley, 2nd Baronet, of Ancoats, and Sophia Annie Every.

Mosley's family were prosperous landowners in Staffordshire.

== Career ==
He was educated at Eton, and went on to own around 3,800 acres (15 km^{2}) of land. His residences included Rolleston Hall in Rolleston on Dove and he was engaged in farming and cattle breeding. He succeeded the baronetcy on 28 April 1890.

Mosley was nicknamed "Baronet John Bull" due to his resemblance to John Bull, the national personification of Great Britain.

== Marriage and issue ==
He married Elizabeth Constance White (b. abt. 1852, d. 13 November 1938), daughter of Sir William White, in the first quarter of 1873 in Marylebone, London. Their son Sir Oswald Mosley, 5th Baronet, of Ancoats (29 December 1873 – 21 September 1928) married Katharine Maud Edwards-Heathcote (1873–1948), the second child of Captain Justinian Edwards-Heathcote of Market Drayton, Shropshire; their son was the Fascist politician Sir Oswald Mosley, 6th Baronet. Their daughter Constance Mosley (Montagu Square, London, 25 April 1881 – Westminster, London, 1963), married as his second wife on 11 March 1907 Charles Fitzroy Ponsonby McNeill (Warmsworth, Yorkshire, 9 December 1866 – 22 November 1955), son of Captain Duncan McNeill and Fanny Charlotte Emma Talbot (married firstly on 31 January 1891 to Lady Hilda Maud Rous, daughter of John Edward Cornwallis Rous, 2nd Earl of Stradbroke, and Augusta Musgrave, by whom he had a son and a daughter), and had one daughter.

Mosley died at his home in Abingworth, near Thakeham in West Sussex on 10 October 1915.

== Arms ==
Coat of arms of Sir Oswald Mosley, 4th Baronet
Crest An eagle displayed ermine. Escutcheon Sable, a chevron between three pickaxes argent. Motto Mos legem regit. "Custom rules the law".

Baronetage of Great Britain
Preceded by Tonman Mosley	Baronet of Ancoats; 1890–1915	Succeeded by Oswald Mosley
