= Sir Oswald Mosley, 2nd Baronet, of Ancoats =

British politician (1785–1871)

The Right Honourable Sir Oswald Mosley Bt FGS
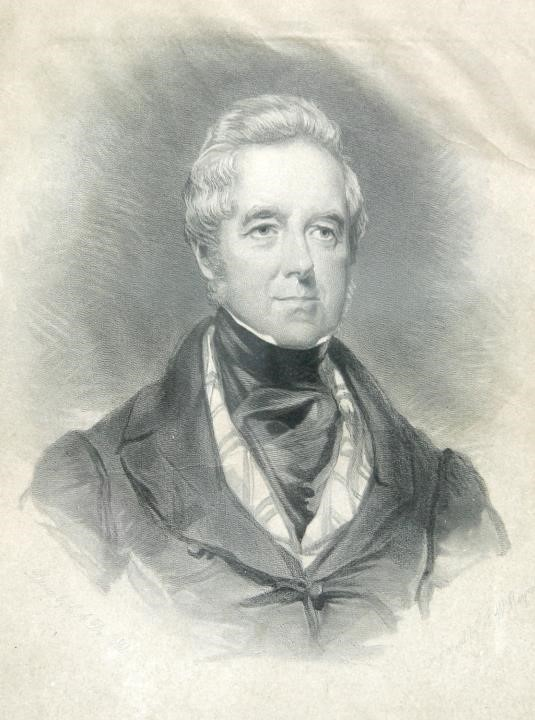

High Sheriff of Staffordshire
- In office 4 February 1814 – 13 February 1815
- Preceded by: Walter Sneyd
- Succeeded by: Henry Crockett

Member of Parliament for North Staffordshire
- In office 1832–1837 Serving with Edward Buller-Yarde-Bulle
- Preceded by: New constituency
- Succeeded by: Hon. Bingham Baring

Personal details
- Born: 27 March 1785
- Died: 24 May 1871 (aged 86) Rolleston, Staffordshire, England
- Spouse: Sophia Anne Every (m. 1804)
- Children: Sir Tonman Mosley, 3rd Baronet
- Parent(s): Oswald Mosley; Elizabeth Tonman

Sir Oswald Mosley, 2nd Baronet (27 March 1785 – 24 May 1871), was an English aristocrat, politician, historian and naturalist. He served as a Member of Parliament (MP) for several constituencies, authored several works in the aforementioned subjects and was High Sheriff of Staffordshire in 1814. A prominent Staffordshire landowner, he succeeded as the 2nd Baronet Mosley, of Ancoats, in 1798.

== Family ==
He was the son of Oswald Mosley (17 March 1761 – 27 July 1789), son of John Mosley (1732–1798), created 1st Baronet Mosley, of Ancoats, in the Baronetage of Great Britain, on 8 June 1781, and his wife Elizabeth Bayley (died 1797), daughter of James Bayley (1705–1769) and Anne Peploe (1702–1769), daughter of Samuel Peploe. John Mosley was the son of Nicholas Mosley (died 1734) and Elizabeth Parker. He had four aunts.

Mosley's family were prosperous landowners in Staffordshire. The family seat was at Rolleston Hall, near Burton upon Trent and he succeeded to the title of 2nd Baronet Mosley, of Ancoats, on 29 September 1798. His uncle Ashton Nicholas Mosley married his mother-in-law Mary Morley and had issue, who succeeded in the House.

== Career ==
Educated at Rugby School, he then attended the University of Oxford where he graduated as a Doctor of Civil Law.

He was Member of Parliament (MP) for Portarlington 1806–1807, Winchelsea 1807–1812, Midhurst 1817–1818 and Staffordshire North 1832–1837. He was High Sheriff of Staffordshire 1814. He was appointed Fellow, Geological Society of London.

He wrote a number of local and natural history books, including History of the Castle, Priory and Town of Tutbury (1832), Gleanings in Horticulture (1851) and Natural History of Tutbury (1863). He also published Family Memoirs (1849), which was essentially a history of the Mosley family.

== Marriage and children ==
He married, on 31 January 1804, Sophia Annie Every (died 8 June 1859), daughter of Sir Edward Every, 8th Baronet, of Eggington, and Mary Morley (who married for a fourth time to Ashton Nicholas Mosley). Sophia was the sister of Henry Every who married his aunt Penelope Mosley. They had 12 children:

- Oswald Mosley (2 December 1804 – 25 September 1856), died without issue
- Sophia Anne Mosley (15 October 1806 – 29 April 1880), died unmarried
- Emily Mosley (8 February 1808 – 25 December 1880)
- Sarah Elizabeth Mosley (8 February 1808 – January 1826)
- Frances Mosley (24 August 1810 – 20 May 1881), married James Heath Leigh of Belmont Hall and had issue
- Sir Tonman Mosley, 3rd Baronet (9 July 1813 – 28 April 1890), who succeeded to the title of Baronet Mosley, of Ancoats
- Mary Anne Mosley (c. 1816 – 20 December 1890), married Major William Fawkener Chetwynd of Brockton Hall, Staffordshire and had issue
- Penelope Mosley (9 November 1816 – 28 August 1833)
- Caroline Mosley (27 July 1818 – 6 May 1862)
- Octavia Mosley (14 February 1820 – 1883)
- Ernald Mosley (13 August 1821 – 23 January 1837)
- Letitia Mosley (27 May 1826 – c. 1863)

Parliament of the United Kingdom
Preceded by John Langston	Member of Parliament for Portarlington; 1806–1807	Succeeded by William Lamb
Preceded by Sir Frederick Fletcher-Vane, Bt; Calverley Bewicke	Member of Parliament for Winchelsea; 1807–1812; With: Calverley Bewicke	Succeeded by William Vane; Calverley Bewicke
Preceded by Thomas Thompson; Viscount Mahon	Member of Parliament for Midhurst; 1817–1818; With: Thomas Thompson	Succeeded by Samuel Smith; John Smith
New constituency	Member of Parliament for North Staffordshire; 1832–1837; With: Edward Manningham-Buller	Succeeded by William Baring; Edward Manningham-Buller
Honorary titles
Preceded by Walter Sneyd	High Sheriff of Staffordshire; 1814	Succeeded by Henry Crockett
Baronetage of the United Kingdom
Preceded by John Mosley	Baronet of Ancoats; 1798–1871	Succeeded by Tonman Mosley
