= W. H. Lane Crauford =

W. H. Lane Crauford was the pen name of William Harold Craxford (1884-1955). Craxford was born into a theatrical family but worked for most of his life at the Midland Bank. In his spare time he published many novels, some of which were crime novels and others of which were light social comedy in the spirit of P. G. Wodehouse.

== Works ==
=== Mystery novels ===
- The Missing Ace
- The Hawkmoor Mystery
- The Crimson Mask
- The Final Curtain
- The Ravenscroft Mystery
- Murder To Music (1936)
- A Date With Death
- Joseph Proctor's Money
- The Bride Wears Black
- Till Murder Do Us Part
- Drakmere Must Die
- Elementary My Dear Freddie
- A Man's Shadow (1951)
- Where Is Jenny Willet?
- The Dearly Beloved Wives
- The Ivory Goddess

=== Humour ===
- Follow The Lady
- Judy
- Dogs In Clover
- When The Devil Was Well
- Sally To Oblige
- The Idle Hours of a Victorious Invalid
- The Imperfect Gentleman
- Pat Preferred (1935)
- The Sixteenth Earl
- And Then A Boy
- Fly Away Peter
- All The King's Men
- Priscilla Goes Astray
- Love On The Run
- Almost A Lady
- An Apple A Day
- Good-Bye George
- The Marriage Of Sophie
- Miss Nobody
- Ladies First
- Gentlemen, The Queen
- Too Good To Be True
- The Stork And Mr Melvil
- The Sky's The Limit
- Time Gentlemen, Please
- And Then There Were Nine
- Money For Jam (1946)
- Clothes And The Man
- Murder Of A Dead Man
- One Man's Meat
- Another Woman's Poison
