= Rolleston Hall =

Former country house in Staffordshire, England

Coordinates: 52.8465°N 1.6545°W

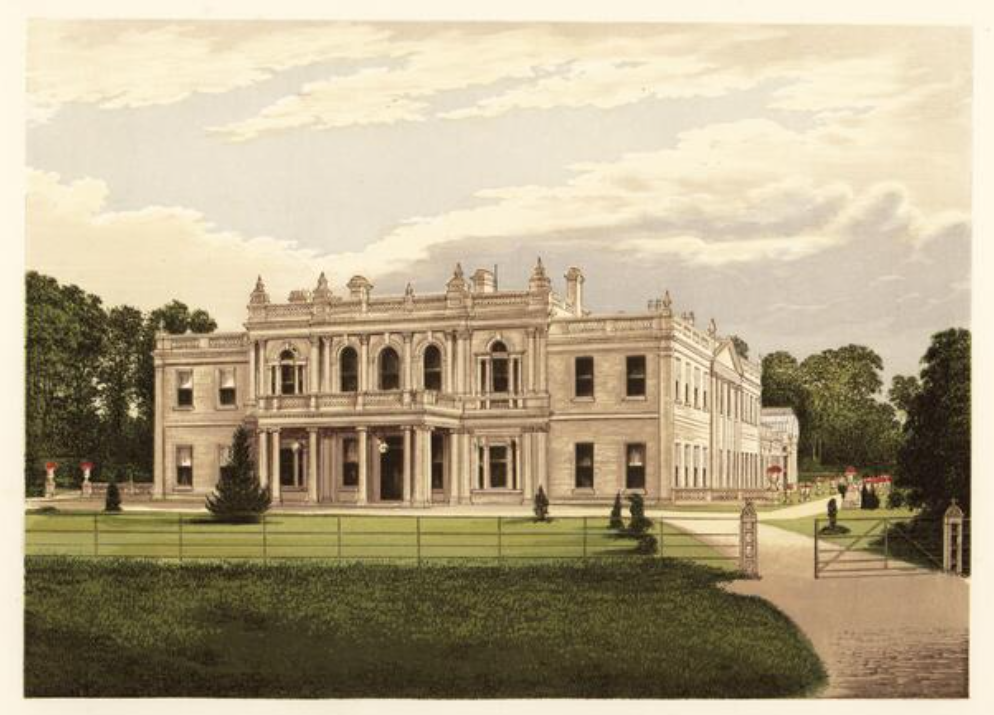
- Rolleston Hall from A series of picturesque views of seats of Noblemen and Gentlemen of Great Britain and Ireland, 1870
- Interactive map of the Rolleston Hall area

General information
- Location: Rolleston-on-Dove, England
- Year built: 1622
- Demolished: 1928

Rolleston Hall was a country house in Rolleston-on-Dove, Staffordshire. Originally built in the early 17th century for Sir Edward Mosley, it had been substantially renovated after a fire in 1871. It was the seat of the Mosley family until the house was demolished in 1928.

== History ==
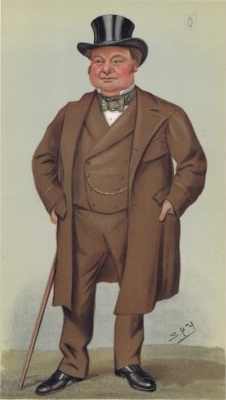
Sir Oswald Mosley, 4th Baronet

A house had stood on the Rolleston site, owned by the de Rolleston family, since the early 13th century. In 1622, the estate was purchased by Sir Edward Mosley, Attorney-General of the Duchy of Lancaster, who wished to escape from the "dark satanic mills" of Manchester to the elegant Staffordshire countryside. He replaced a wooden house with a stone-built one and died unmarried in 1638 after which the property passed to his nephew Sir Edward Mosley, 1st Baronet, and in turn to his son, Sir Edward Mosley, 2nd Baronet. During the English Civil War, King Charles I and his army came into Staffordshire and Royalist soldiers were quartered at Rolleston.

Rolleston Hall later devolved to Oswald Mosley (High Sheriff of Staffordshire for 1715), who was created a baronet (the second creation of the title) in 1720. The property then passed down to John Parker Mosley, who was also created a baronet (the third creation of the title) in 1781.

During the ownership of Sir Tonman Mosley, 3rd Baronet, in 1871 the hall was devastated by fire and subsequently rebuilt to a higher standard. The last Mosley to be connected with Rolleston Hall was Sir Oswald Mosley, the 6th Baronet and well-known founder of the British Union of Fascists (BUF). He was the MP for Harrow from 1918 to 1924 and for Smethwick from 1926 to 1931. The estate however was sold in his father's lifetime in 1923 and after unsuccessful efforts to sell the hall it was largely demolished in 1928. Some remnants were converted into flats.

The GWR Hall Class locomotive 5973 "Rolleston Hall" was named after the house.

== See also ==
- Mosley baronets
