= Nicholas Mosley =

English novelist (1923–2017)

The Right Honourable The Lord Ravensdale MC FRSL

Member of the House of Lords
- Lord Temporal
- In office 9 February 1966 – 11 November 1999 as a hereditary peer
- Preceded by: The 2nd Baroness Ravensdale
- Succeeded by: Seat abolished (Note: Pursuant to the House of Lords Act 1999.)

Personal details
- Born: 25 June 1923 London, England
- Died: 28 February 2017 (aged 93)
- Resting place: Highgate Cemetery, London
- Spouses: Rosemary Laura Salmond (m. 1947; div. 1974) Verity Elizabeth Raymond (m. 1974)
- Children: 5 (including Ivo)
- Parents: Sir Oswald Mosley, 6th Baronet; Lady Cynthia Curzon
- Relatives: Irene Curzon (aunt); Max Mosley (half-brother); Daniel Mosley (grandson)
- Education: Eton College
- Alma mater: Balliol College, Oxford
- Occupation: Novelist
- Other titles: 7th Baronet
- Military career
- Branch: British Army
- Rank: Lieutenant
- Service number: 256103
- Unit: Rifle Brigade
- Conflicts: World War II
- Awards: Military Cross

Nicholas Mosley, 3rd Baron Ravensdale (25 June 1923 – 28 February 2017), was a British peer, novelist and biographer. Two of his volumes of biography covered the life of his father, Sir Oswald Mosley, the founder of the British Union of Fascists.

== Life ==
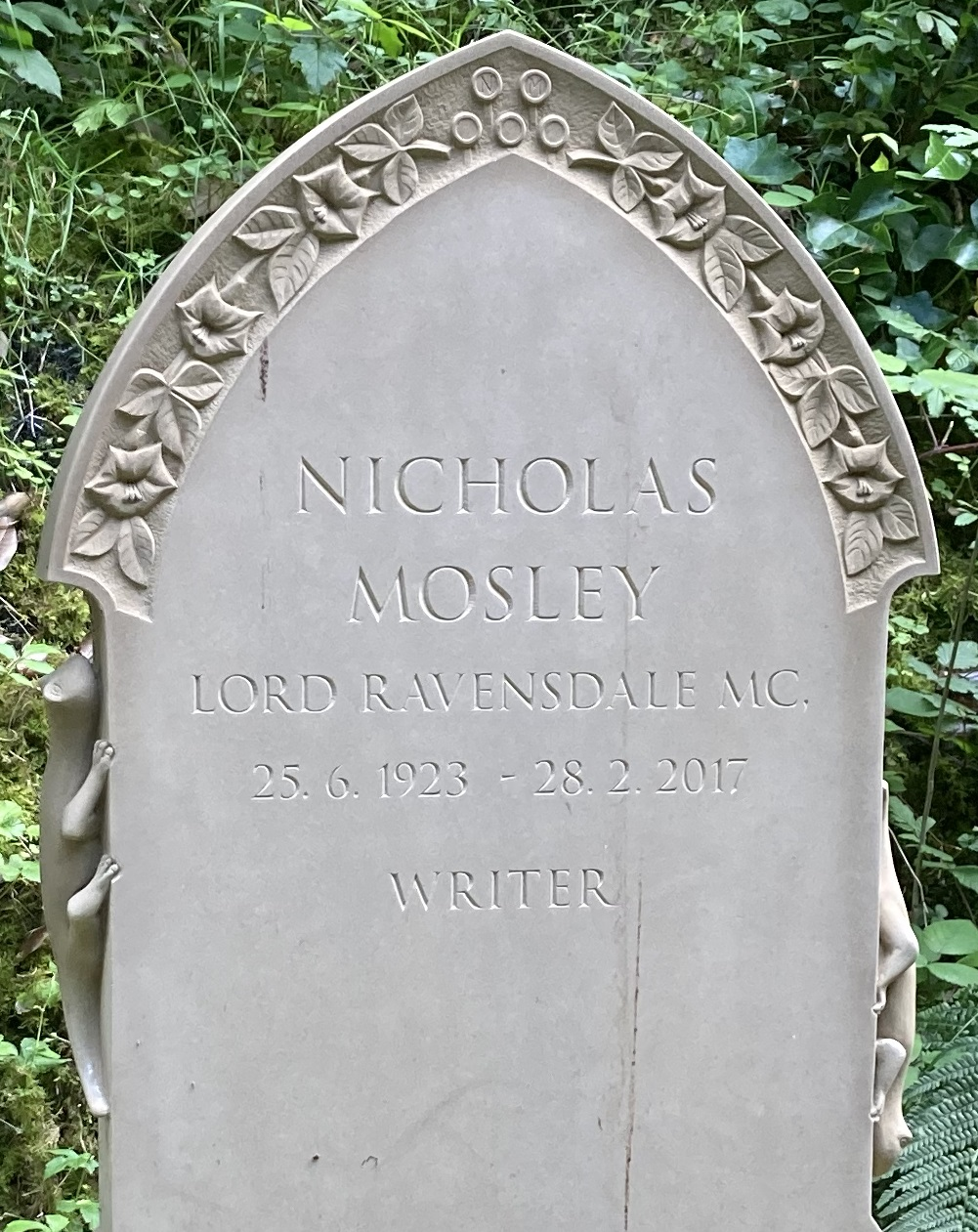
Grave of Nicholas Mosley, Lord Ravensdale, in Highgate Cemetery, north London

Mosley was born in London in 1923. He was the eldest son of Sir Oswald Mosley, 6th Baronet, a British politician, and his first wife, Lady Cynthia Mosley, a daughter of George Curzon, 1st Marquess Curzon of Kedleston (a Viceroy of India and at the time of Mosley's birth Foreign Secretary). In 1932, Sir Oswald founded the British Union of Fascists and became an open supporter of Benito Mussolini. The following year, when he was only nine, Nicholas's mother, Lady Cynthia, died, and in 1936 Diana Mitford, one of the Mitford sisters, who was already his father's lover, became his stepmother.

As a young boy, Mosley began to stammer, and he attended weekly sessions with the speech therapist Lionel Logue to help him manage it. He later recalled that his father said he never really noticed this stammer, but still, he may, as a result of it, have been less aggressive when speaking to him than towards other people. Mosley was educated at Eton and Balliol College, Oxford. In 1940, his father was interned because of his campaigning against the war with Germany. The younger Mosley was soon commissioned into the Rifle Brigade and saw active service in Italy, winning the Military Cross in 1945.

Following the war he studied philosophy at Oxford for a short time before marrying, taking to farming in north Wales before ultimately concentrating on his writing, primarily as a novelist but also producing several biographies.

In 1966, Mosley succeeded his aunt Irene Curzon, 2nd Baroness Ravensdale, his mother's elder sister, as Baron Ravensdale, thus gaining a seat in the House of Lords; he did not use the title. On the death of his father, on 3 December 1980, he also succeeded to the Mosley baronetcy of Ancoats. In 1983, two years after his father's death, Mosley published Beyond the Pale: Sir Oswald Mosley and Family 1933–1980 in which he proved to be a harsh critic of his father. He called into question his father's motives and understanding of politics. The book contributed to the Channel 4 television programme Mosley (1998), based on Oswald Mosley's life. At the end of the serial, Nicholas is portrayed meeting his father in prison to ask him about his national allegiance.

He was a half-brother of Max Mosley, former President of the Fédération Internationale de l'Automobile (FIA).

Mosley died on 28 February 2017 and is buried in the western side of Highgate Cemetery.

== Personal life ==
Mosley married twice and was the father of five children. On 14 November 1947, he married firstly Rosemary Laura Salmond (divorced 1974, died 1991), daughter of Sir John Maitland Salmond and the Honourable Monica Margaret Grenfell, and they had four children:

- Hon. Shaun Nicholas Mosley (5 August 1949 – 10 December 2009), married Theresa Clifford, and had six children, including Daniel Nicholas Mosley, 4th Baron Ravensdale.
- Hon. Ivo Adam Rex Mosley (14 April 1951 – 31 January 2024), married Xanthe Jennifer Grenville Oppenheimer, daughter of Sir Michael Oppenheimer, 3rd Baronet, and had four children.
- Hon. Robert Mosley (born 24 December 1955), married Victoria McBain, and had three children.
- Hon. Clare Mosley (born 11 November 1959), unmarried.

In 1974, after a divorce, he married secondly Verity Elizabeth Raymond, daughter of John Raymond, and had one son:

- Hon. Marius Mosley (born 28 May 1976).

== Arms ==
Coat of arms of Nicholas Mosley
Coronet A Coronet of a Baron Crest An eagle displayed ermine Escutcheon Quarterly 1st and 4th, sable a chevron between three Pickaxes argent (Mosley); 2nd and 3rd, argent on a bend sable three Popinjays or collared gules (Curzon) Supporters Dexter: a Raven proper; Sinister: a Popinjay proper collared gules Motto Mos legem regit ("Custom rules the law")

== Bibliography ==
=== Novels ===
- Spaces of the Dark (R. Hart-Davis, 1951)
- The Rainbearers (Weidenfeld and Nicolson, 1955)
- Corruption (Little, Brown, 1957)
- Meeting Place (Weidenfeld and Nicolson, 1962)
- Accident (Hodder and Stoughton, 1965; Dalkey Archive, 1985). Filmed in 1966 by Joseph Losey with a screenplay by Harold Pinter.
- Assassins (Hodder and Stoughton, 1966; Dalkey Archive, 1997)
- Impossible Object (Hodder and Stoughton, 1968; Dalkey Archive, 1985). Shortlisted for the first Booker Prize in 1969 and filmed in 1973 by John Frankenheimer as Story of a Love Story.
- Natalie Natalia (Hodder and Stoughton, 1971; Dalkey Archive, 1996)
- Catastrophe Practice series:
  - Catastrophe Practice (Secker & Warburg, 1979; Dalkey Archive, 1989)
  - Imago Bird (Secker & Warburg, 1980; Dalkey Archive, 1989)
  - Serpent (Secker & Warburg, 1981; Dalkey Archive, 1990)
  - Judith (Secker & Warburg, 1986; Dalkey Archive, 1991)
  - Hopeful Monsters (Secker & Warburg, 1990; Dalkey Archive, 1991). Won the Whitbread Book of the Year Award.
- Children of Darkness and Light (Secker & Warburg, 1995; Dalkey Archive, 1997)
- The Hesperides Tree (Secker & Warburg, 2001; Dalkey Archive, 2001)
- Inventing God (Secker & Warburg, 2003; Dalkey Archive, 2003)
- Look at the Dark (Secker & Warburg, 2005; Dalkey Archive, 2006)
- God's Hazard (Dalkey Archive, 2009)
- A Garden of Trees (Dalkey Archive, 2012)
- Metamorphosis (Dalkey Archive, 2014)
- Tunnel of Babel (Dalkey Archive, 2016)
- Rainbow People (Dalkey Archive, 2018)

=== Non-fiction ===
- African Switchback (Weidenfeld and Nicolson, 1958)
- The Life of Raymond Raynes (Hodder and Stoughton, 1961)
- Experience and Religion: A Lay Essay in Theology (Hodder and Stoughton, 1965; Dalkey Archive, 2006)
- The Assassination of Trotsky (1972; filmed by Joseph Losey)
- Julian Grenfell: His Life and the Times of His Death, 1888–1915 (Weidenfeld and Nicolson, 1976; Persephone Books, 1999)
- Rules of the Game: Sir Oswald and Lady Cynthia Mosley 1896–1933 (Secker & Warburg, 1982) vol. 1
- Beyond the Pale: Sir Oswald Mosley and Family 1933–1980 (Secker & Warburg, 1983) vol. 2
- Rules of the Game / Beyond the Pale: Memoirs of Sir Oswald Mosley and Family (Dalkey Archive, 1991; Secker & Warburg, 1994)
- The Uses of Slime Mould: Essays of Four Decades (Dalkey Archive, 2004)

=== Other ===
- Efforts at Truth: An Autobiography (Secker & Warburg, 1994; Dalkey Archive, 1995)
- Time at War (Dalkey Archive, 2006) memoir
- Paradoxes of Peace, or the Presence of Infinity (Dalkey Archive, 2009)

== Notes ==
Peerage of the United Kingdom
Preceded by Irene Curzon	Baron Ravensdale; 1966–2017; Member of the House of Lords (1966–1999)	Succeeded by Daniel Mosley
Baronetage of Great Britain
Preceded by Oswald Mosley	Baronet of Ancoats; 1980–2017	Succeeded by Daniel Mosley
