= Stoke and Wexham War Memorial =

War memorial in Wexham, Buckinghamshire, England

Coordinates: 51.542507°N 0.573148°W

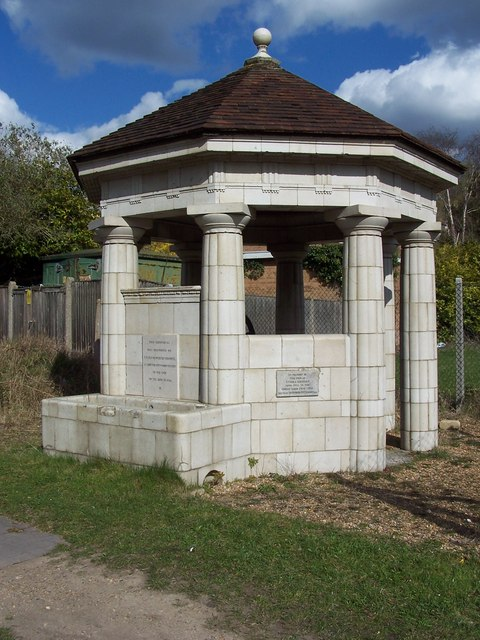
Stoke and Wexham War Memorial

Stoke and Wexham War Memorial is located in Wexham Street, Wexham, Buckinghamshire, England. It is a grade II listed building with Historic England and commemorates the men of the area who died in the First World War. It is in the form of a pavilion housing a pump that supplies a drinking fountain and horse trough. It was erected by Sir Bernard Oppenheimer (1866-1921).
