= Seconds (1966 film) =

1966 film by John Frankenheimer

- Theatrical release poster
- Directed by: John Frankenheimer
- Screenplay by: Lewis John Carlino
- Based on: Seconds (1963 novel) by David Ely
- Produced by: Edward Lewis
- Starring: Rock Hudson; Salome Jens; John Randolph; Will Geer
- Cinematography: James Wong Howe
- Edited by: David Newhouse; Ferris Webster
- Music by: Jerry Goldsmith
- Production companies: Joel Productions; John Frankenheimer Productions; Gibraltar Productions
- Distributed by: Paramount Pictures
- Release dates: May 16, 1966 (Cannes); October 5, 1966 (New York City); November 9, 1966 (Los Angeles)
- Running time: 107 minutes
- Country: United States
- Language: English
- Budget: $2.5 million
- Box office: $1.75 million (US and Canada rentals)

Seconds is a 1966 American science-fiction psychological horror film directed by John Frankenheimer and starring Rock Hudson, Salome Jens, and Will Geer. The screenplay by Lewis John Carlino is based on the 1963 novel by David Ely. Set in New York City and Malibu, California, the film tells the story of a middle-aged New York banker who, disillusioned with his life, is contacted by an agency known as "The Company" which specializes in providing "rebirths" under new identities and appearances altered by plastic surgery.

The film premiered at the 1966 Cannes Film Festival, where it was nominated for the Palme d'Or. It was released in the United States by Paramount Pictures on 5 October 1966. Though it was a financial disappointment, it received positive reviews and has since developed a cult following. At the 39th Academy Awards, the film received a nomination for Best Cinematography (James Wong Howe).

In 2015, the United States Library of Congress selected the film for preservation in the National Film Registry, finding it "culturally, historically, or aesthetically significant".

== Plot ==
Arthur Hamilton is a middle-aged banking executive in Scarsdale, New York, who, despite his professional success, remains profoundly unfulfilled. His love for his wife, Emily, has dwindled, and he seldom sees his only daughter, who has relocated to the West Coast and started a family. One day, Arthur receives an address placed into his hand by an unknown person who, somehow, knew his name. Later that day he receives a call from his childhood friend, Charlie, whom he believed to be dead. Though Arthur is initially disbelieving, Charlie claims it was he who approached him with the address and then recounts personal anecdotes that only he could know. Charlie informs him that he must go to the address provided; that it is imperative for him to do so because his life is empty of all motivation and choice.

After some contemplation, Arthur decides to take up Charlie's proposition, and travels to the address, which he finds to be an apparent meat-packing plant; there, he is given workman's clothing and headgear, then exits the facility by a different door and is seated inside a truck that takes him to another building. There he meets a woman who directs him to an office and provides him with tea. He finds that he has been drugged and tries to leave the complex. He wanders around and disappears into a large area filled with dark, empty hallways and finds himself in a vulnerable woman's bedroom and while trying to become intimate with her, in his intoxication, he seemingly sexually assaults her. After waking, Arthur is informed that the Company's service comes at a cost of $30,000 and is shown a film of the prior staged assault, ostensibly to make his decision easier. Although he recoils at the apparent use of blackmail, Arthur reluctantly accepts on his own terms, after considering the emptiness in his life. The associates inform Arthur that they will fake his death in a hotel fire using an anonymous cadaver, and Arthur proceeds to undergo multiple extensive procedures by Dr. Innes that transform not only his facial features, but his vocal cords, teeth, and even fingerprints. Once healed, he is given the identity of the younger "Antiochus 'Tony' Wilson", an established visual artist. Arthur later discovers this identity has been taken from someone who recently died.

Arthur is relocated by the Company into a community in Malibu, California, filled with people like him who are also "reborns". He attempts to assimilate into his new life, in which he is able to live as an artist —a career he had always aspired to— though he soon finds himself growing restless. While visiting the beach one day, Arthur encounters the freewheeling Nora Marcus. The two develop a swift attraction to each other, and Nora recounts how she came to leave her former life behind. One night, Arthur accompanies Nora to a Bacchanalia party in Santa Barbara. There, the revelers dance, sing, and stomp grapes in a large trough and, after some initial discomfort, Arthur lowers his inhibitions and begins to enjoy himself. Later, Arthur and Nora host a cocktail party for neighbors and other guests. Arthur gets drunk over the course of the night, and begins to speak openly to the other guests about his former identity, which is forbidden by the Company. Consequently, Arthur receives a phone call from Charlie, who warns him that he has put himself in danger by violating the Company's rules. Charlie also reveals that Nora is an employee of the Company who covertly oversees new "reborns" to assure they have a smooth transition.

Disenchanted by his new contrived life, Arthur defiantly leaves California, and returns to New York. He arranges a meeting with Emily at his former home, claiming —as Tony— that he was once a friend of Arthur's. The two have a conversation in which Emily shares that she felt Arthur was emotionally disconnected from his life, and was in a constant state of longing that she could not understand. After the meeting, a melancholic Arthur is met by associates of the Company, and he requests that they give him a different identity. They agree to do so, but only if he can provide them with another referral to the Company. He tells them he does not know anyone he could proposition, and demands they carry out the transformation anyway.

Returning to the headquarters, Arthur is placed in a waiting room with various other men, including his friend Charlie, all of whom have asked to undergo yet another 'rebirth'. An elated Charlie is chosen and is escorted from the waiting room. Frustrated at the unknown amount of time the men have been waiting to be chosen, and being unable to think of anyone that he can refer to the Company, Arthur angrily demands that his procedure is performed without further delay. Later, as Arthur is wheeled into the operating room, he is met by a chaplain who begins to read him his last rites. After being bound, gagged, and sedated, Arthur comes to realize he is about to be killed. Dr. Innes, who performed Arthur's original transformation, coldly laments to Arthur that he is sorry it has to end this way, and that Arthur's transformation into Tony was his "best work". He explains that Arthur's body will be used as the catalyst for another patient's transformation — the staged scene for that patient's faked death will be a car accident. Dr. Innes proceeds to drill into Arthur's skull to inflict a brain hemorrhage consistent with head injuries sustained in a car crash. As Arthur loses consciousness, he stares into the surgical light, and has a vision (or memory) of a man and his infant daughter playing on a beach; the image distorts and loses resolution as Arthur dies.

== Cast ==
- Rock Hudson as Antiochus "Tony" Wilson
- Salome Jens as Nora Marcus
- John Randolph as Arthur Hamilton
- Will Geer as Old Man
- Jeff Corey as Mr. Ruby
- Richard Anderson as Dr. Innes
- Murray Hamilton as Charlie
- Karl Swenson as Dr. Morris
- Khigh Dhiegh as Davalo
- Frances Reid as Emily Hamilton
- Wesley Addy as John
- Nedrick Young as Henry Bushman
- John Lawrence as Texan
- Elisabeth Fraser as Plump Blonde
- Dody Heath as Sue Bushman
- Dorothy Morris as Mrs. Filter
- Robert Brubaker as Mayberry
- Barbara Werle as Secretary
- Edgar Stehli as Taylor Shop Presser
- Frank Campanella as Man in Station
- William Wintersole as Doctor in Operating Room

== Analysis ==
In the 2012 film The Pervert's Guide to Ideology, the psychoanalytical philosopher Slavoj Žižek discusses the film as an example of what happens when desires are fulfilled.

== Production ==
=== Development ===
Frankenheimer had completed several successful films before his involvement with the project, namely Birdman of Alcatraz (1962), The Manchurian Candidate (1962), and Seven Days in May (1964). These last two films together with Seconds sometimes are referred to as Frankenheimer's "paranoia trilogy".

=== Casting ===
For the central role of Antiochus "Tony" Wilson, Frankenheimer had sought Kirk Douglas, whose company, Joel Productions, was producing the film. When Douglas was unavailable due to other commitments, Frankenheimer offered the role to Laurence Olivier. After reading the screenplay, Olivier agreed to take the part, but Paramount Pictures objected to the casting, believing that Olivier was not a big enough star at the time. Hudson was cast in the feature despite attempts by friends and colleagues to dissuade him. He wanted to expand his range, and felt he was typecast from his many romantic comedy roles. "He was one of the nicest guys I’ve ever met," Frankenheimer recounted of Hudson. "He really wanted to do this picture, but he would only do it as the second character. He didn’t think he could handle the older character."

=== Filming ===
Principal photography of Seconds began on June 14, 1965, with a budget of $2.5 million. Filming primarily occurred in Malibu, California, where much of the film is set, with additional photography occurring in Scarsdale, New York, where the first act of the film takes place, as well as New York City. In order to successfully shoot a transition sequence in Grand Central Station, Frankenheimer hired a Playboy Bunny to pose as an actress filming a scene during which she stripped down into a bikini in the terminal; this distracted onlookers, allowing Frankenheimer to successfully capture the footage he needed without interruption. The Dionysian-themed party sequence was shot on location with a handheld camera in Santa Barbara, California, during an annual wine festival held there.

The director of photography for Seconds was James Wong Howe, who pioneered novel techniques in black-and-white cinematography and whose career spanned nearly five decades. While shooting the sequences inside the company's headquarters (which were constructed on the Paramount Studios lot), Howe employed an innovative system featuring "complete lighting of sets for closeups, long shots, etc., sans separate setups, plus the use of ceilinged sets." Filming was completed in August 1965.

In Frankenheimer's commentary on the DVD, he notes:

- An actual rhinoplasty operation was filmed to provide shots for inclusion in the depiction of Hamilton's plastic surgery. Frankenheimer shot some of the footage after the cameraman fainted.
- The scenes in Wilson's Malibu beach house were filmed in Frankenheimer's home.

=== Post-production ===
The opening titles of the film were designed by Saul Bass, using Helvetica set in white over optically warped black-and-white motion picture photography. During the editing process, Frankenheimer chose to excise a scene in which Arthur meets with his daughter in California after his transformation into Tony. Frankenheimer's wife, Evans Evans, portrayed Arthur's daughter in the scene. Frankenheimer later lamented his decision to remove the scene from the film, suggesting that it made the second act weaker.

Additionally, a sequence in which Arthur encounters a father and his young daughter on the beach was removed from the final cut. A brief portion appears as the film's final shot, which Arthur recounts as he dies. Lewis John Carlino, the film's screenwriter, confirmed this in a 1997 interview: "That refers to a previous scene that was also cut. Hudson encounters a father and his young daughter on the beach. It’s the key scene for me. Without it, the last image doesn’t make sense."

== Release ==
Seconds premiered at the 1966 Cannes Film Festival on May 16, running in competition for the Palme d'Or. The film was not well received by the audience, and its screening ended with boos of disapproval.

The film premiered in the United States in New York City on October 5, 1966, and opened in Los Angeles the following month, on November 9, 1966.

=== Censorship ===
Paramount Pictures, the American distributor of the film, demanded that Frankenheimer cut approximately seven minutes of the film for its release in the United States. The footage that was ultimately excised for the American theatrical release consisted of the grape-stomping sequence that occurs at the party Arthur attends with Nora. The sequence, which features full-frontal nudity from the various extras, was deemed too controversial by the studio. Frankenheimer recalled: "The Catholic Church objected to the nudity, so it was cut. But it made the grape-stomping [seem] like an orgy. That was not my intention. It was supposed to be a release for [Arthur]."

The original 107-minute cut of the film had only been shown in Europe until May 1997, when the film was rereleased in the United States in its full form to commemorate its thirtieth anniversary.

=== Home media ===
Seconds was released on home video for the first time in May 1997. The film was released on DVD on January 8, 2002, and later went out of print. The Criterion Collection released a newly restored version of Seconds on DVD and Blu-ray on August 13, 2013.

== Reception ==
=== Box office ===
Seconds performed poorly on its initial American release, and was considered a box office bomb. The film grossed an estimated $1.75 million in U.S. and Canadian rentals. It has since become a cult classic.

=== Critical response ===
A reviewer in Time wrote: "Director John Frankenheimer and veteran photographer James Wong Howe manage to give the most improbable doings a look of credible horror. Once Rock appears, though, the spell is shattered, and through no fault of his own. Instead of honestly exploring the ordeal of assuming a second identity, the script subsides for nearly an hour into conventional Hollywood fantasy...Seconds has moments, and that's too bad, in a way. But for its soft and flabby midsection, it might have been one of the trimmest shockers of the year."

Seconds has since gained an overall positive reaction, currently holding a 79% "fresh" rating on Rotten Tomatoes, based on 61 reviews. Rotten Tomatoes' consensus reads: "Featuring dazzling, disorienting cinematography from the great James Wong Howe and a strong lead performance by Rock Hudson, Seconds is a compellingly paranoid take on the legend of Faust." Metacritic, which uses a weighted average, assigned the film a score of 71 out of 100, based on 17 critics, indicating "generally favorable" reviews.

Writing in Time Out New York, Andrew Johnston wrote: "Seconds is easily one of the most subversive films ever to have come out of Hollywood: Even as it exposes the folly of selfishly abandoning one's commitments, it also makes a passionate case for following one's heart and rejecting conformity...This chilling portrayal of a well-meaning guy stuck in a Kafkaesque nightmare is unlike anything else he [Hudson] did."

=== Awards and nominations ===
Institution	Ref.	Category	Nominee	Result	Ref.
Academy Awards	1967	Best Cinematography	James Wong Howe	Nominated	
Bambi Awards	1967	Best Actor - International	Rock Hudson	Nominated	
Cannes Film Festival	1966	Palme d'Or	John Frankenheimer	Nominated	

== Legacy ==
In the years since its release, Seconds has earned a reputation as a cult film. Directors Park Chan-wook, Bong Joon-ho and Gaspar Noé named Seconds as one of their favorite films.

Seconds became known for its connection to the Beach Boys' Brian Wilson. The story, which originated in the October 1967 magazine article "Goodbye Surfing, Hello God!", goes that when he arrived late to a theater showing of Seconds, he appeared to be greeted with the onscreen dialogue, "Come in, Mr. Wilson." He was convinced for some time that rival producer Phil Spector (one of the film's investors) was taunting him through the movie, and that it was written about his recent traumatic experiences and intellectual pursuits, going so far as to note that "even the beach was in it, a whole thing about the beach." He later cancelled the Beach Boys' forthcoming album Smile, and the film reportedly frightened him so much that he did not visit another movie theater until 1982's E.T. the Extra-Terrestrial.

== See also ==
- List of American films of 1966
- Body swap appearances in media
- Mind uploading
- Mind uploading in fiction
- Whole-body transplants in popular culture

== Bibliography ==
- Booker, Keith M. (2011). Historical Dictionary of American Cinema. Lanham, Maryland: Scarecrow Press. ISBN 978-0-810-87459-6.
- Dillon, Mark (2012). Fifty Sides of the Beach Boys: The Songs That Tell Their Story. Toronto, Ontario: ECW Press. p. 269. ISBN 978-1-77090-198-8.
- Hurley, Neil P. (1970). Theology Through Film. New York City, New York: Harper & Row. OCLC 1245821053.
- Schneider, Steven Jay, ed. (2008). 1001 Movies You Must See Before You Die. Quintessence Editions. Hauppauge, New York: Barron's Educational Series. ISBN 978-0-7641-6151-3.
- Wilson, Brian; Gold, Todd (1991). Wouldn't It Be Nice: My Own Story. New York City, New York: HarperCollins. ISBN 978-0-06-018313-4.
