= Ivo Mosley =

British writer (1951–2024)

- Born: 14 April 1951; London, England
- Died: 31 January 2024 (aged 72)
- Occupations: Writer, poet, potter
- Spouse: Xanthe Oppenheimer (m. 1977)
- Father: Nicholas Mosley

Ivo Adam Rex Mosley (14 April 1951 – 31 January 2024) was a British writer, poet and potter. His career encompassed ceramics, poetry, social commentary, opera and musical theatre. In latter years his focus was works of non-fiction relating to politics and monetary reform.

== Background ==
Born in London on 14 April 1951, the son of writer Nicholas Mosley, and grandson of British Fascist Oswald Mosley, Ivo Mosley went to Bryanston School before studying Japanese at New College, Oxford. In 2007 he also completed an MA in musical theatre at Goldsmiths College, London.

In 1977 he married the artist Xanthe Oppenheimer, daughter of Sir Michael Oppenheimer, 3rd Baronet.

Ivo Mosley died at home from motor neurone disease and dementia, on 31 January 2024, at the age of 72.

== Ceramics ==
Whilst studying, Mosley became fascinated by Japanese pottery and porcelain. On completing his degree in 1972, he purchased a kiln and started making pots. Based in London, this was his career until 1987, and he became known for his bold use of colour and the development of new glazing techniques. Not unlike other Oxbridge educated ceramicists such as Edmund de Waal, Mosley combined pottery with writing; he was asked to write articles on his techniques of firing and glazing, and had an ongoing project translating Japanese poetry.

Mosley's ceramics have been exhibited at The National Theatre, Liberty of London and elsewhere and sold through Designers Guild.

== Poetry ==
His Japanese studies inspired Mosley with a profound interest in Japanese poetry. On graduating he began translating the waka poet Kakinomoto no Hitomaro's work for The Dublin Magazine then under the editorship of John Ryan.

In 1993 Frontier Publishing published his The Green Book of Poetry, a poetry anthology of over 300 poems from around the world, originally written in 30 different languages in defence of nature. Mosley provided commentary and many translations, but the poets most heavily featured are the Australian ecopoet Judith Wright, and Brendan Kennelly, who once said "Poetry is the ultimate democracy". In 1996 Harper SanFrancisco re-published the anthology as Earth Poems: Poems from Around the World to Honor the Earth, updated and including eighty new and contemporary poems and commentary. Mosley's own original poems have been featured in journals and national newspapers. In 1999 he was appointed Poetry Editor at the Journal of Consciousness Studies.

== Writing ==
In 2000, Mosley's first work of non-fiction, Dumbing Down, a collection of essays and interviews on the concept of dumbing down, was published on Imprint Academic. Contributors to the publication include Michael Oakshott, Ravi Shankar, Phillip Rieff, Robert Brustein, Roger Deakin, Adam Boulton, Peter Randall-Page, Claire Fox, John Ziman and Jaron Lanier.

Mosley followed this in 2003 with Democracy, Fascism and the New World Order, and a second book about democracy, In The Name of the People published by Imprint Academic in 2013. In this book Mosley clarifies the distinction between representative government and rule by the people, along with the former's dangers, citing works such as The History of the Origins of Representative Government (1821/22) by François Guizot, later prime minister of France. The long chapter How Debt Came to Rule the World charges elected representative governments with betraying the people by allowing banks to create the money supply, recommends Bank Credit by C. A. Phillips (1920) as the clearest extant explanation of the current international banking system, and quotes heavily from Henry Calvert Simons' Economic Policy for a Free Society (University of Chicago Press, 1951).

One of Mosley's last books, Bank Robbery, has been serialised on two monetary reform websites, The Cobden Centre, and Positive Money.

Ivo Mosley was a vocal critic of the fascist politics of his grandfather Oswald Mosley, often commenting publicly on the "evil legacy" of fascism. As a journalist he has written widely and internationally on topics including democracy, religion, multiculturalism, science, and economics.

Mosley also wrote articles for national newspapers, including the Telegraph, the Catholic Herald, Resurgence, and the Times Higher Education Supplement, mostly reviewing works of non-fiction.

== Opera and theatre ==
From the late 1990s, Mosley wrote a number of pieces for theatre, film and opera including ‘Danny’s Dream’ (1st performance: Joseph Rowntree Theatre, York, 1998) ‘Science’ (Bridewell Theatre, London 2002), and ‘The London Women’s Buskers Orchestra Meet for the End of the World’ (Battersea Arts Centre, 2008). Personal Justice is a short thriller film (2005) which Mosley wrote and scored. Mad King Suibhne, an opera for which he wrote the libretto, was produced by Bury Court Opera and had its first performance in 2017 at Messum's Wiltshire.
