= Natalie Natalia =

1971 novel by Nicholas Mosley

- First edition (publ. Hodder & Stoughton)
- Author: Nicholas Mosley
- Language: English
- Publication date: 1971

Natalie Natalia is a novel by Nicholas Mosley first published in 1971 about a middle-aged British MP who, while seemingly on the brink of insanity, conducts an adulterous affair with the wife of a colleague.

== Plot summary ==
The protagonist of this novel, Anthony Greville, is a Member of Parliament who is married with two children. His son Adam is seventeen and his daughter Sophie is eight. Despite the outward perfection of his life, Greville is having an affair with sculptor Natalia Jones, an enigmatic mother of two who is married to a husband in politics who cheats on her. Greville's wife is away at the family's country retreat for weeks on end and his children at their respective schools, so Greville enjoys his lover's company with minimal risk of being discovered. However, as smitten with Natalia as Greville is, he has a brief fling with a woman named Madeleine, as well.

In spite of his easy lifestyle, Greville is not a happy man. The focus of this novel is based on Greville's dissatisfactions and confusions. For instance, although Natalia does not make any demands on him, and his wife prefers not to see what is going on, Greville is torn between the two women. He wants to be with Natalia when he is with his wife and vice versa. What is more, he sees two people in his lover. To Anthony Greville, Natalia is an angelic figure who also symbolizes a diametrical opposite, specifically demonic. This dual perception of his lover leads him call her by two different names (Natalie and Natalia).

Greville becomes disillusioned with politics, because he feels that political gaming prefers stalemate to partisanship, and therefore, opposes real change. Subsequently, Greville states that he is going to resign from Parliament as soon as possible. This is a startling announcement because Greville comes from a family of politicians, and his son is already active in grassroots politics. However, before his intended resignation, he must complete a final diplomatic mission as an MP; he journeys to Central Africa to meet Ndoula, a controversial freedom fighter who has been imprisoned by the colonial powers. While he is in Africa, without the emotional chaos of his personal life, Greville begins to introspect, writing and trying to make sense of his life.

When Greville returns to England, he finds that both his wife and his idealistic son are leaving for Africa in order to help the current crisis. Greville sees them off at the airport, and then returns to Natalia, even though she has not answered his letters from abroad.

Although interesting and similar in content and intent to the works of Graham Greene, the plot line of Natalie Natalia can be construed as "difficult to follow" because the linear narration is interrupted by segments where Greville's thoughts, dreams, and fantasies become the focus of the prose.

An example of such an interruptive/introspective segment in Greville's POV (from Chapter 7) follows :

[…] I had rowed into the harbour from the sea; the oars had made whirlpools. A light appeared in the window: your breast, above the candle, burned. We wrapped our cloaks round us: ran with our shoulders against the drawbridge. Hands came through the door and held us; they were tendrils through the stone. You watched from an upstairs window. We were in the hallway of the castle. You stood with the candle and one hand against your breast. The candle burned: it made blood against the snow. The man with the beak of a bird put his head down to embrace you: with one arm round his neck, you were a tunnel through which he could breathe. On the stairs were figures in suits of armour.

Firelight flickered. You were laid on a table with one leg raised. The man with the mask of a bird rummaged inside you. He was looking in you like a suitcase. I had been in the cell all winter alone. Turning you on your front, you had been split up the back by an axe. Men in white coats stood around you. They had instruments in their hands with which to handle coals. They flipped them over. You had your face to the wall and were fastened to iron rings. The man with the beak of a bird tore the lining. Hands had come through the wall and held me. Your arms were round the neck of the man with the mask like a swan.

He reached to the entrails and the liver. Men leaned over tables and shovelled coal. Their pink cheeks glowed. You stood with a hand at your breast and the candle burning you. On the stairs were men in armour; their swords flickered. With your back towards them, they heated irons in the coal. They lifted your leg up and put it on the table. Moving with my hands behind me, I felt an iron ring in the stone. If I pulled, there would be a tunnel: I could put an iron bar across the hole. At the end of it would be a cell. There I had been all winter. […]

== Read on ==
- A. N. Wilson's Scandal and Josephine Hart's Damage are two other British novels depicting extramarital affairs of politicians which eventually lead to their downfall.
- The protagonist of Saul Bellow's Henderson the Rain King also travels to Africa to find enlightenment there.
