= Daniel Mosley, 4th Baron Ravensdale =

British hereditary peer (born 1982)

The Right Honourable The Lord Ravensdale CEng MIMechE
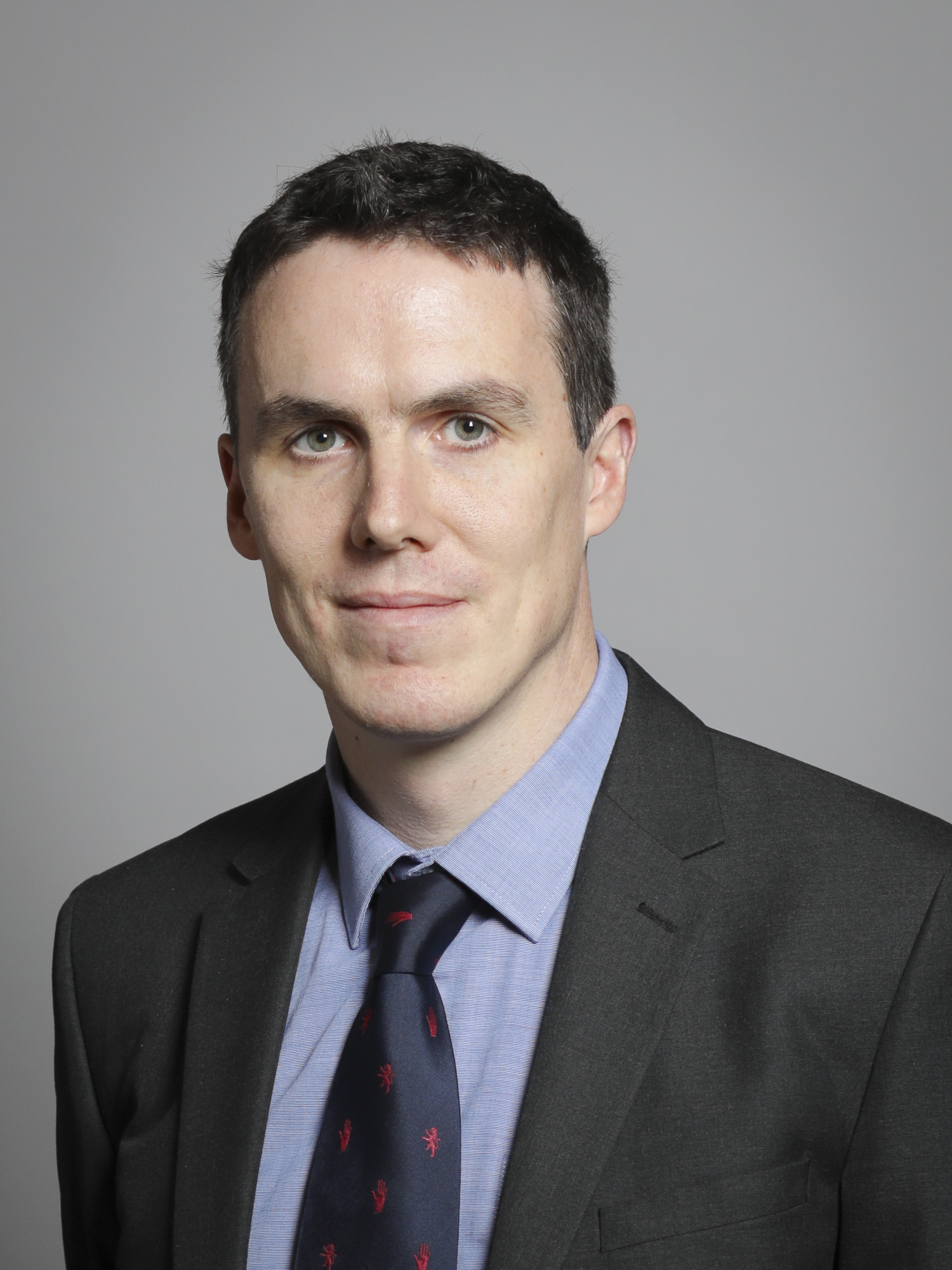
- Official portrait, 2019

Member of the House of Lords Lord Temporal
- Incumbent
- Life peerage 12 June 2026
- Elected Hereditary Peer; 3 April 2019 – 29 April 2026
- By-election: 2019
- Preceded by: The 2nd Viscount Slim
- Succeeded by: Seat abolished

Personal details
- Born: Daniel Nicholas Mosley; 10 October 1982 (age 44) Nottingham, England
- Party: Crossbench
- Spouse: Rachael Carter (m. 2010)
- Relations: Nicholas Mosley (grandfather); Sir Oswald Mosley (paternal great-grandfather)
- Children: 3
- Parents: Hon. Shaun Mosley; Teresa Clifford
- Education: University of Sheffield
- Profession: Engineer
- Other titles: 8th Baronet (of Ancoats)

Daniel Nicholas Mosley, 4th Baron Ravensdale, Baron Ravensdale of Little Eaton, 8th Baronet (born 10 October 1982), is a British hereditary peer and member of the House of Lords who sits as a crossbencher. He is an engineer, currently working as a project director for AtkinsRéalis. His paternal great-grandfather was Oswald Mosley, leader and founder of the British Union of Fascists.

On 28 February 2017, he succeeded his grandfather, the novelist Nicholas Mosley (who did not use the titles), in the Mosley baronetcy and as Baron Ravensdale, a peerage created for his great-great-grandfather George Curzon, 1st Marquess Curzon of Kedleston.

In May 2026, it was announced that he was to be given one of 26 new life peerages, returning him to the House of Lords after the coming into force of the House of Lords (Hereditary Peers) Act 2026.

== Education and career ==
Daniel Nicholas Mosley was born on 10 October 1982 in Nottingham to the Hon. Shaun Nicholas Mosley and Teresa Frances Mosley (née Clifford). He attended the University of Sheffield and graduated with a first-class honours degree in aerospace engineering.

He joined Atkins as a systems engineer in 2006 before becoming a project manager in 2011 and a project director in 2015.

== House of Lords ==
On 27 March 2019, Ravensdale won a crossbench hereditary peers' by-election, succeeding Viscount Slim in the House of Lords. In his election statement, he had pledged to "champion the Midlands and commit to regular attendance alongside [his] consultancy work, benefiting the House by maintaining [his] expert knowledge of engineering and industry".

== Personal life ==
Mosley married Rachael Carter in 2010. They have three sons.

He supported the Remain campaign in the 2016 United Kingdom European Union membership referendum, but later opposed a second referendum on the withdrawal agreement.

== Arms ==
Coat of arms of Daniel Mosley, 4th Baron Ravensdale
Coronet The Coronet of a Baron Crest An eagle displayed ermine Escutcheon Quarterly 1st and 4th, sable a chevron between three Pickaxes argent (Mosley); 2nd and 3rd, argent on a bend sable three Popinjays or collared gules (Curzon) Supporters Dexter: a Raven proper; Sinister: a Popinjay proper collared gules Motto Mos legem regit ("Custom rules the law")

Peerage of the United Kingdom
Preceded by Nicholas Mosley	Baron Ravensdale; 2017–present	Incumbent; Heir apparent: Hon. Alexander Mosley
Baronetage of Great Britain
Preceded by Nicholas Mosley	Baronet of Ancoats; 2017–present	Incumbent; Heir apparent: Hon. Alexander Mosley
Parliament of the United Kingdom
Preceded by The Viscount Slim	Elected hereditary peer to the House of Lords under the House of Lords Act 1999; 2019–2026	Position abolished under the House of Lords (Hereditary Peers) Act 2026
