= Baron Ravensdale =

Barony in the Peerage of the United Kingdom

- Arms of Baron Ravensdale (Note: The arms of the present baron include that of Mosley, as follows: Quarterly: 1st and 4th, Sable a Chevron between three Pickaxes Argent (Mosley); 2nd and 3rd, Argent on a Bend Sable three Popinjays Or collared Gules (Curzon).)
- Creation date: 2 November 1911
- Created by: George V
- Peerage: United Kingdom
- First holder: George Curzon, 1st Baron Curzon of Kedleston
- Present holder: Daniel Mosley, 4th Baron Ravensdale
- Remainder to: (Special remainder) to the male issue of the 1st Baron's eldest daughter and the heirs male of her body; to his second and every other younger daughter successively in order of birth, and the heirs male of their bodies
- Former seat: Kedleston Hall

Baron Ravensdale, of Ravensdale in the County of Derby, is a title in the Peerage of the United Kingdom. It was created in 1911 for the Conservative politician George Curzon, 1st Baron Curzon, of Kedleston, who had previously served as Viceroy of India.

== History ==
The title was created on 2 November 1911 for the Conservative politician George Curzon, 1st Baron Curzon, with remainder, in default of issue male, to his eldest daughter and the heirs male of her body, failing whom to his other daughters in like manner in order of primogeniture. Curzon was created Viscount Scarsdale and Earl Curzon of Kedleston at the same time. The viscounty was created with special remainder to the heirs male of his father while the earldom was created with normal remainder to heirs male. Curzon had already in 1898 been created Baron Curzon of Kedleston in the Peerage of Ireland (the last Irish peerage to be created), with remainder to heirs male. In 1916 he succeeded his father as fifth Baron Scarsdale and in 1921 he was further honoured when he was made Earl of Kedleston and Marquess Curzon of Kedleston, with remainder to heirs male.

Lord Curzon died without male issue in 1925 and the barony of Curzon of Kedleston, the two earldoms and the marquessate thus became extinct. He was succeeded in the viscountcy of Scarsdale according to the special remainder by his nephew, Richard Curzon, the second Viscount (who also succeeded as sixth Baron Scarsdale; see Viscount Scarsdale for further history of this branch of the family). The barony of Ravensdale passed according to the special remainder to his eldest daughter Irene. In 1958, following the passage of the Life Peerages Act 1958 which permitted women to sit in the House of Lords, Lady Ravensdale was granted a life peerage with the title of Baroness Ravensdale of Kedleston, of Kedleston in the County of Derby. As of 2019 the title is held by her great-great-nephew the fourth Baron, who succeeded in 2017 and was elected to sit in the House of Lords in 2019. He is the great-grandson of Lady Cynthia (second daughter of Lord Curzon of Kedleston) and her husband Oswald Mosley. He also succeeded his grandfather as eighth Baronet of Ancoats. (See Mosley baronets for earlier history of this title.)

== Baron Ravensdale (1911) ==
- George Nathaniel Curzon, 1st Marquess Curzon of Kedleston, 1st Baron Ravensdale (1859–1925)
- Mary Irene Curzon, 2nd Baroness Ravensdale (1896–1966)
- Nicholas Mosley, 3rd Baron Ravensdale (1923–2017)
  - Hon. Shaun Nicholas Mosley (1949–2009)
- Daniel Nicholas Mosley, 4th Baron Ravensdale (born 1982)

The heir apparent is the present holder's eldest son, the Hon. Alexander Lucas Mosley (born 2012).

=== Title succession chart ===
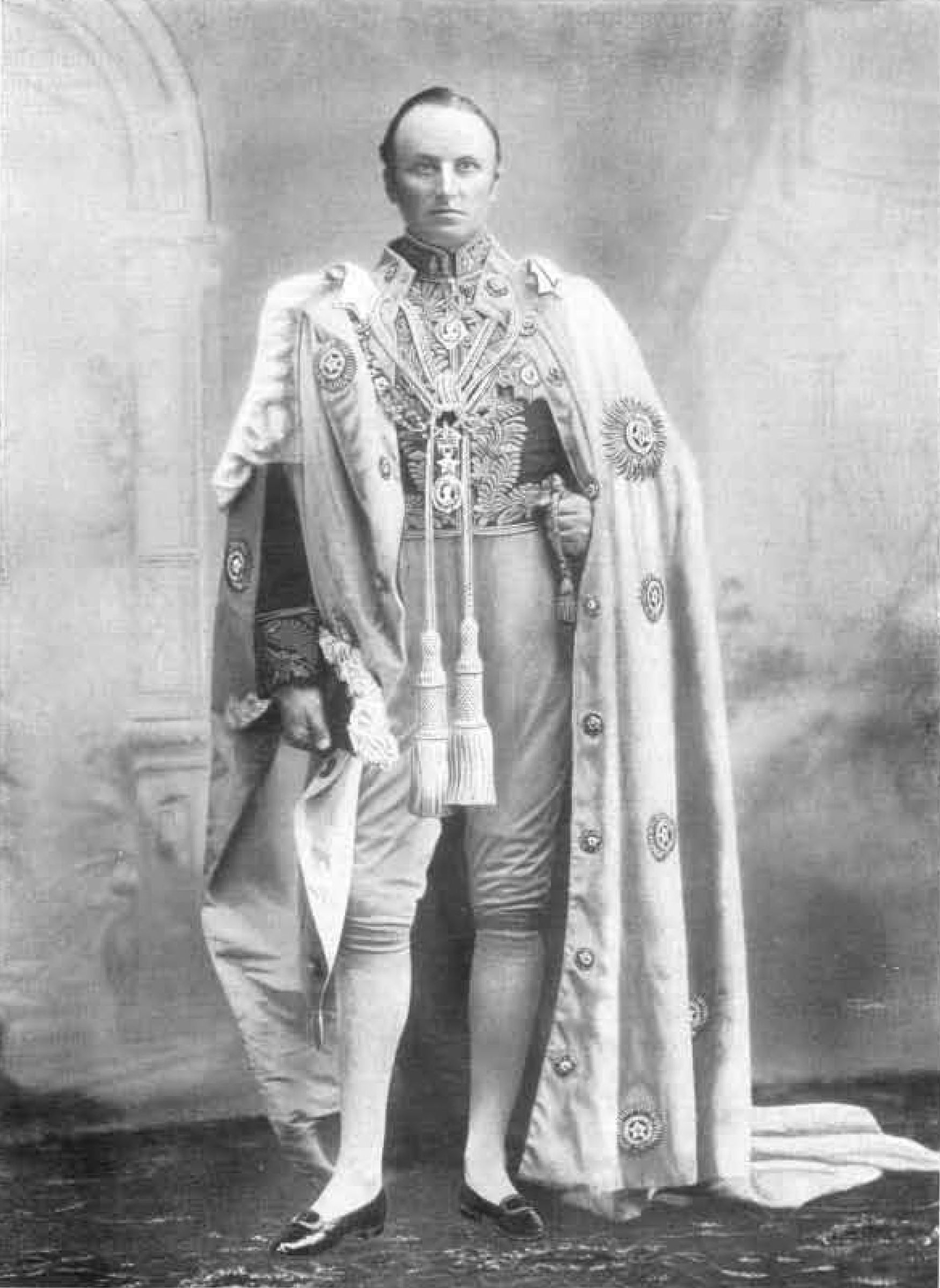
George Curzon, 1st Baron Ravensdale (later 1st Marquess Curzon of Kedleston)

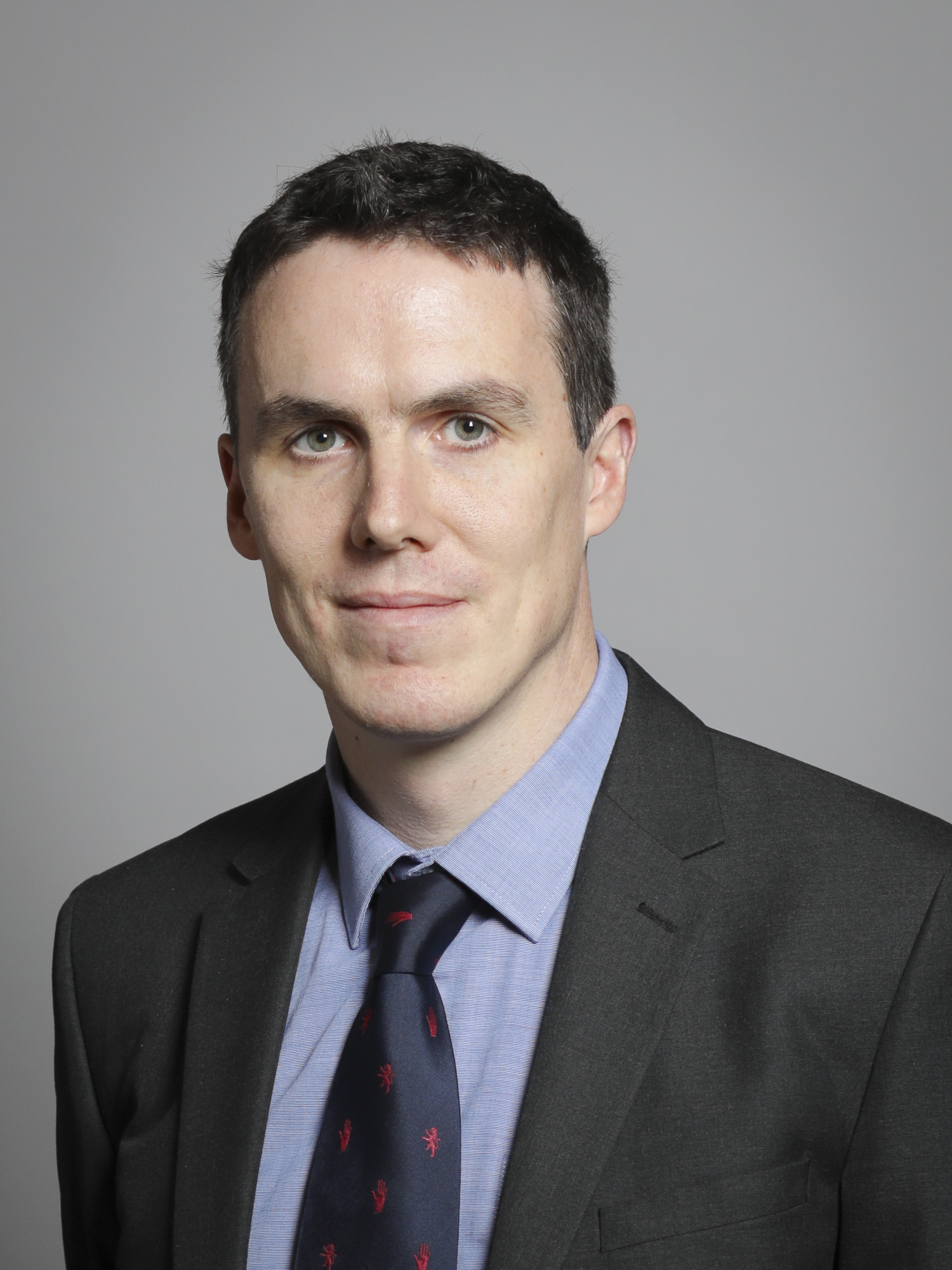
Daniel Mosley, 4th Baron Ravensdale

Title succession chart, Barons Ravensdale

Marquess Curzon of Kedleston; Earl of Kedleston; Earl Curzon of Kedleston; Viscount Scarsdale; Baron Ravensdale; Baron Curzon of Kedleston
George Curzon; 1st Marquess Curzon of Kedleston; 1st Earl of Kedleston; 1st Earl Curzon of Kedleston; 1st Viscount Scarsdale; 1st Baron Ravensdale; 1st Baron Curzon of Kedleston; 5th Baron Scarsdale; 9th baronet (N.Sc., E.); 1859–1925
Marquessate, both earldoms and Curzon barony extinct, Scarsdale viscountcy and barony and both baronetcies inherited by Richard Curzon
Irene Curzon; 2nd Baroness Ravensdale; 1896–1966	Lady Cynthia Curzon; 1898–1933
Nicholas Mosley; 3rd Baron Ravensdale; 7th Baronet; 1923–2017
Hon. Shaun Mosley; 1949–2009
Daniel Mosley; 4th Baron Ravensdale; 8th Baronet born 1982
Hon. Alexander Mosley born 2012

== See also ==
- Viscount Scarsdale
- Baron Anslow
- Mosley baronets
