= Impossible Object (novel) =

1968 novel by Nicholas Mosley

- First edition
- Author: Nicholas Mosley
- Language: English
- Publisher: Hodder & Stoughton
- Publication date: 1968
- Publication place: United Kingdom

Impossible Object is a 1968 novel written by Nicholas Mosley. It was shortlisted for the Booker Prize in 1969.

== Film adaptation ==
In 1973, a motion picture adaptation starring Alan Bates, and Dominique Sanda was released. The film was scripted by the novel's author, Nicholas Mosley.
