= Impossible Object =

- Belgian film poster
- Directed by: John Frankenheimer
- Screenplay by: Eric Kahane; Nicholas Mosley
- Based on: Impossible Object by Nicholas Mosley
- Produced by: Jud Kinberg
- Starring: Alan Bates; Dominique Sanda; Michel Auclair; Evans Evans; Lea Massari
- Cinematography: Claude Renoir
- Edited by: Albert Jurgenson
- Music by: Michel Legrand
- Production companies: Franco London Film; Robert Bradford Productions; Euro International Films
- Distributed by: Valoria Films (France); Euro International Films (Italy)
- Release date: 24 May 1973
- Running time: 113 minutes
- Country: France; Italy
- Language: English; French
- Budget: $1.8 million

Impossible Object (French: L'Impossible Objet), also known as Story of a Love Story, is a 1973 romantic drama film starring Alan Bates and Dominique Sanda. It was directed by John Frankenheimer with a screenplay by Nicholas Mosley based on his own novel. It was screened at the 1973 Cannes Film Festival, but was not entered into the main competition. Mosley wrote the screenplay at the behest of director Joseph Losey, whose film Accident was based on an earlier Mosley novel. Dirk Bogarde and Catherine Deneuve had been attached to the film. However, Losey had difficulty financing the film and later fell out with Mosley over The Assassination of Trotsky. Frankenheimer, looking to make an independent film, took over the project.

== Cast ==
Credits adapted from the Powerhouse Films Blu-ray booklet.

- Alan Bates as Harry
- Dominique Sanda as Natalie
- Michel Auclair as Georges
- Evans Evans as Elizabeth
- Paul Crauchet as the Plumber
- Lea Massari as Hippolyta
- Sean Bury as Adam
- Henri Czarniak as Private Investigator
- Vernon Dobtcheff as Private Investigator
- Mark Dightam as James
- Isabelle Giraud-Carrier as Danielle
- Michael McVey as Richard
- Laurence de Monaghan as Cleo
- André Rouille as Gendarme

== Production ==
Principal photography for this movie was delayed until Dominique Sanda gave birth to her son (in April 1972). John Frankenheimer shot footage of a pregnant and naked Sanda, which was used in the movie when her character Nathalie, Harry's mistress, is pregnant with his child.

== Reception ==
The film was a financial failure. Frankenheimer later said it was never properly released because the producers went bankrupt. However, the film saw some success at the 1974 Atlanta Film Festival, where it won the Grand Award Gold Phoenix for best film. Mosley also won for best screenplay and composer Michel Legrand for his film score. Frankenheimer said he entered the film with a stolen print.
