= John Frankenheimer =

American film and television director (1930–2002)

- Born: John Michael Frankenheimer; February 19, 1930; New York City, New York, U.S.
- Died: July 6, 2002 (aged 72); Los Angeles, California, U.S.
- Education: Williams College (B.A., 1951)
- Occupation: Film director
- Years active: 1948–2002
- Spouses: Joanne Frankenheimer (divorced); Carolyn Miller (m. 1954; div. 1962) Evans Evans (m. 1963)
- Children: Two
- Awards: See below

John Michael Frankenheimer (February 19, 1930 – July 6, 2002) was an American film and television director, known both for his social dramas and his action/suspense pictures. Among his best-known theatrical film credits are Birdman of Alcatraz, The Manchurian Candidate (both 1962), Seven Days in May, The Train (both 1964), Seconds, Grand Prix (both 1966), The Fixer (1968), The Iceman Cometh (1973), French Connection II (1975), Black Sunday (1977), 52 Pick-Up (1986), and Ronin (1998).

His nearly 40 feature films and over 50 plays for television were notable for their influence on contemporary thought. He became a pioneer of the "modern-day political thriller", having begun his career at the height of the Cold War. He won four Emmy Awards – three consecutive – in the 1990s for directing the television movies Against the Wall, The Burning Season, Andersonville, and George Wallace, the last of which also received a Golden Globe Award for Best Miniseries or Television Film. He was inducted into the Television Hall of Fame in 2002.

Frankenheimer was technically highly accomplished from his days in live television; many of his films were noted for creating "psychological dilemmas" for his male protagonists along with having a strong "sense of environment", similar in style to films by director Sidney Lumet, for whom he had earlier worked as assistant director. He developed a "tremendous propensity for exploring political situations" which would ensnare his characters. Critic Leonard Maltin writes that "in his time [1960s] ... Frankenheimer worked with the top writers, producers and actors in a series of films that dealt with issues that were just on top of the moment – things that were facing us all."

== Early years ==
I was always a very introverted child, and as far back as seven years old, I recall finding great escape in films ... in all seriousness, I have always been terribly interested in films and it was not something that happened to me later in life. I look back and realize it was the medium I liked most. – John Frankenheimer, quoted in The Cinema of John Frankenheimer (1968)

Frankenheimer was born in Queens, New York City, the son of Helen Mary (née Sheedy) and Walter Martin Frankenheimer, a stockbroker. His father was of German Jewish descent, his mother was Irish Catholic, and Frankenheimer was raised in his mother's religion. As a youth Frankenheimer, the eldest of three siblings, struggled to assert himself with his domineering father.

Growing up in New York City he became fascinated with cinema at an early age, and recalls avidly attending movies every weekend. Frankenheimer reports that in 1938, at the age of seven or eight, he attended a 25-episode, 7 1/2 hour marathon of The Lone Ranger accompanied by his aunt.

In 1947, he graduated from La Salle Military Academy in Oakdale, Long Island, New York, and in 1951 he earned a baccalaureate in English from Williams College in Williamstown, Massachusetts. As captain of the tennis team at Williams, Frankenheimer briefly considered a professional career in tennis, but reconsidered:

I gave that up when I really started acting at eighteen or nineteen, because there wasn't any time to do both ... my interest was more toward acting in those days and an actor is what I wanted to be. I did act at college and summer stock for a year. But I was really not a very good actor. I was quite shy and quite stiff...

=== Air Force Film Squadron: 1951–1953 ===
After graduating from Williams College, Frankenheimer was drafted into the Air Force and assigned to the Reserve Officers' Training Corps (ROTC), serving in the Pentagon mailroom at Washington, D.C. He quickly applied for and was transferred, without any formal qualifications, to an Air Force film squadron in Burbank, California. It was there that Lieutenant Frankenheimer "really started to think seriously about directing".

Frankenheimer recollects his early apprenticeship with the Air Force photography unit as one of almost unlimited freedom. When he was a junior officer, Frankenheimer claimed, his superiors "couldn't have cared less" what he did in terms of utilizing the filmmaking equipment. Frankenheimer reports that he was free to set up the lighting, operate the camera and perform the editing on projects he personally conceived. His first film was a documentary about an asphalt manufacturing plant in Sherman Oaks, California. Lieutenant Frankenheimer recalls moonlighting, at $40-a-week, as writer, producer and cameraman making television infomercials for a local cattle breeder in Northridge, California, in which livestock were presented on the interior stage sets. (The Federal Communications Commission terminated the programming after 15 weeks.) In addition to mastering the basic elements of filmmaking, he began reading widely on film technique, including the writings of Soviet director Sergei Eisenstein. Frankenheimer was discharged from the military in 1953.

== Television's "Golden Age": 1953–1960 ==
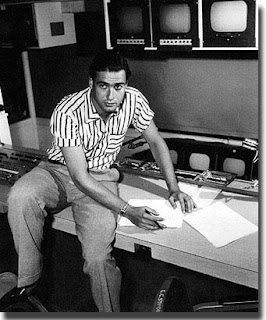
Frankenheimer at Columbia Broadcasting Studios (CBS), 1952

During his years in military service, Frankenheimer strenuously sought a film career in Southern California. Failing this, at the age of 23, he returned to New York upon his military discharge to seek work in the emerging television industry. His earnestness impressed Columbia Broadcasting System (CBS) television executives, landing him a job in the summer of 1953 to serve as a director of photography on The Garry Moore Show. Frankenheimer recalls his apprenticeship at CBS:

When I stop and look back on [The Garry Moore Show] ... I was particularly well-suited for that job ... what you would do is prepare a shot for the director. He would tell you what he wanted and you would get it from the cameraman ... You'd also be responsible for the timing of the show. But I think – well, I know – I was born with a good eye for the camera and so the job really was playing right into what I would call my own strength.

Television scripts [of the 1950s] exploring problems at the societal level were systematically ignored (i.e. racial discrimination, structural poverty, and other social ills). Instead, critics complain, too many "golden age" dramas were little more than simplistic morality tales focusing on the everyday problems and conflicts of weak individuals confronted by personal shortcomings such as alcoholism, greed, impotence, and divorce, for example.... [I]t is important to note that the "golden age" coincided with the Cold War era and McCarthyism and that cold-war references, such as avoiding communism and loving America, were frequently incorporated in teleplays of the mid to late 1950s. – Anna Everett in "Golden Age" Museum of Broadcast Communications

Frankenheimer was picked up as assistant to director Sidney Lumet's for CBS's historical dramatization series You Are There, and further on Charles Russell's Danger and Edward R. Murrow's Person to Person. In late 1954 Frankenheimer replaced Lumet as director on You Are There and Danger under a five-year contract (with a studio standard option to terminate a director with a two-week notice). Frankenheimer's directorial début was The Plot Against King Solomon (1954), a critical success.

Throughout the 1950s he directed over 140 episodes of shows like Playhouse 90 and Climax! under the auspices of CBS executive Hubbell Robinson and producer Martin Manulis. These included well-regarded adaptations of works by Shakespeare, Eugene O'Neill, F. Scott Fitzgerald, Ernest Hemingway and Arthur Miller. Leading actors and actresses from film and stage starred in these live productions, among them Ingrid Bergman, John Gielgud, Mickey Rooney, Geraldine Page and Jack Lemmon. Frankenheimer is widely considered a preeminent figure in the so-called "Golden Age of Television".

Film historian Stephen Bowie offers this appraisal of Frankenheimer's legacy from the "Golden Age" of television:

Along with Sidney Lumet, John Frankenheimer was the major director to emerge from and be influenced by the aesthetics of live television drama, which flourished briefly in the US ... Frankenheimer's later fame, and his oft-repeated nostalgia for live television, have designated him as the quintessential exponent of the form: this is a crucial misconception. The aesthetics of live television were defined by their temporal and spatial limitations: all that could be shown was what could be physically created within an hour or half-hour and photographed within the confines of a small space [emphasizing] cramped blue-collar settings ("kitchen drama") because these were the most easily staged for live broadcast ... [though] perfectly suited to this world of emotional intimacy and physical claustrophobia, Frankenheimer reacted instinctively against it. He sought material and visual strategies that expanded the boundaries of what could be done in live television ... As the live TV director who took the medium in an explicitly cinematic direction, Frankenheimer was actually the least typical.

== Film career ==
Frankenheimer's earliest films addressed contemporary issues such as "juvenile delinquency, criminality and the social environment" and are represented by The Young Stranger (1957), The Young Savages (1961) and All Fall Down (1962).

=== The Young Stranger (1957) ===
Frankenheimer's first foray into filmmaking occurred while he was still under contract to CBS television. The head of CBS in California, William Dozier, became the CEO of RKO movie studios. Frankenheimer was assigned to direct a film version of his television Climax! production titled "Deal a Blow", written by William Dozier's son, Robert. The 1956 movie version, The Young Stranger, stars James MacArthur as the rebellious teenage son of a powerful Hollywood movie producer (James Daly). Frankenheimer recalled that he found his first film experience unsatisfactory:

I have a very high regard for my [television] crews, because I hand pick them; on The Young Stranger I was given a crew, and I thought they were terrible and treated me very badly. It made me very bitter about the whole experience ... I felt very confined, constricted and a bad director ... There were so many things I thought I could have done but didn't do ... As a result of this experience I was fed up with films and went back to television.

Frankenheimer adds that in the late 1950s, television was transitioning from live productions to taped shows: "... a live television director was like being a village blacksmith after the advent of the automobile ... I knew I had to get out..." In 1961 Frankenheimer abandoned television and returned to filmmaking after a four-year hiatus, continuing his examination of the social themes that informed his 1957 The Young Stranger. Film historian Gordon Gow distinguishes Frankenheimer's handling of themes addressing individualism and "misfits" during the Fifties' obsession with disaffected teenagers:

There was an especially true feeling to the problem of the 16-year-old boy who became "The Young Stranger" ... This film, in 1957, at the height of the problem-teen vogue, sounded a quiet note of contrast. In part, its genuine quality might be put down to the fact [both director and writer] were in their mid-twenties – much nearer to the age of their central character [James MacArthur], about twenty himself at the time (but looking younger) ... What made it especially distinctive amid the general sensationalism was the triviality of the boy's misdemeanor: a minor bit of roughhouse in a neighborhood cinema ... The difference between The Young Stranger, which attained a happy ending plausibly, and the general run of delinquent-problem movies was its moderation...

=== The Young Savages (1961) ===
Frankenheimer's second cinematic effort is based on novelist Evan Hunter's A Matter of Conviction (1959). United Artists publicity executives changed the box-office title to the vaguely lurid The Young Savages, to which Frankenheimer objected. The story involves the attempted political exploitation of a brazen murder involving Puerto Rican and Italian youth gangs set in New York City's Spanish Harlem. District Attorney, Dan Cole (Edward Andrews), who is seeking the state governorship, sends assistant D. A. Hank Bell (Burt Lancaster) to gather evidence to secure a conviction. Bell, who grew up in the tenement district, has escaped from his impoverished origins to achieve social and economic success. He initially adopts a cynical hostility towards the youths he investigates, which serves his own career aims. The narrative explores the human and legal complexities of the case and Bell's struggle to confront his personal and social prejudices and commitments. The film's arresting opening sequence depicting a killing, which is key to the plot, reveals Frankenheimer's origins in television. The action, "brilliantly filmed and edited", occurs preliminary to the credits, and is accompanied by an impelling soundtrack by composer David Amram, serving to quickly rivet audience interest.

The Young Savages, though focusing on juvenile delinquency, is cinematically a significant advance over Frankenheimer's similarly themed first film effort The Young Stranger (1957). Film historian Gerald Pratley attributes this to Frankenheimer's insistence on hand-picking his leading technical support for the project, including set designer Bert Smidt, cinematographer Lionel Lindon and scenarist JP Miller. Pratley observed:

"The Young Savages is far more alive and real than [The Young Stranger]...the youths might well be some of those we met in the first film, but now further along their delinquent ways. The acting throughout is authoritative, with vivid portrayals by the Italian and Puerto Rican players...the entire film is photographically alive with a strong, visual sense which was to characterize all of Frankenheimer's future work…"

Though "contrived and familiar in its social concerns" Frankenheimer and leading man Burt Lancaster, both Liberals in their political outlook, dramatize the "poverty, violence and despair of city life" with a restraint such that "the events and characters seem consistently believable." Frankenheimer recalled: "I shot The Young Savages mainly to show people that I could make a movie, and while it was not completely successful, my point was proved...The film was made on a relatively cheap budget and shooting on location in New York for a Hollywood company is very expensive. Those were the days before Mayor Lindsay when you had to pay off every other cop on the beat…"

=== All Fall Down (1962) ===
The coming of age film All Fall Down was both filmed and released while Frankenheimer's Birdman of Alcatraz (1962) was in post-production and his The Manchurian Candidate (1962) was in pre-production.

The picture was scripted by William Inge, who also wrote Splendor in the Grass (1961) and concerns character Berry-Berry (Warren Beatty), an emotionally irresponsible hustler, and his adoring younger brother Clinton (Brandon deWilde), to whom Berry-Berry appears as a romantic Byronesque figure. The elder brother's cruel treatment of Echo O'Brien (Eva Marie Saint), his lover who becomes pregnant, disabuses the naive Clinton of Berry-Berry's perfection. His anguished insight permits Clinton to achieve emotional maturity and independence. Film critic David Walsh comments:

"All Fall Down is vaguely moralistic and conformist, and the scenes of the Beatty character's comeuppance contrived in the extreme. All Fall Down is saved by the portrayals of Eva Marie Saint, quiet and gracious, as the unfortunate Echo, and Angela Lansbury, extravagant and outlandish, as Berry-Berry's mother, within whom incestuous fires appear to blaze. Critics have noted that Annabell Willart (Lansbury) was the first of three desperately controlling mothers in Frankenheimer's films of 1962: the other two played by Thelma Ritter in Birdman of Alcatraz (1962) and Lansbury again in The Manchurian Candidate (1961). In all three films, the father is either weak or absent."

=== Birdman of Alcatraz (1962) ===
“I can't really think of a scene in Birdman of Alcatraz I liked. I like the total effect of the film, but I don't think there was any scene that stands out for me as being extraordinary in any way.” – John Frankenheimer in Gerald Pratley's The Cinema of John Frankenheimer (1969)

Based on a biography by Thomas E. Gaddis, Birdman of Alcatraz (1962) is a documentary-like dramatization of the life of Robert Stroud, sentenced to life imprisonment in solitary confinement for killing a prison guard. While serving his sentence, Stroud (Burt Lancaster) becomes a respected expert in avian diseases though the study of canaries. Frankenheimer traces Stroud's emergence from his anti-social misanthropy towards a humane maturity, despite the brutal conditions of his incarceration.

In 1962, the production and filming of Birdman of Alcatraz was already underway when United Artists enlisted Frankenheimer to replace British director Charles Crichton. As such, key production decisions had already been made, and Frankenheimer regarded himself as a "hired director" with little direct control over the production. Producer Harold Hecht and screenwriter Guy Trosper insisted on an exhaustive adaption of the Gaddis biography. The filmed rough cut that emerged was over four hours in length. When simply editing the work was ruled out as impracticable, the script was rewritten and the film largely re-shot, producing a final cut of 2½ hours. According to Frankenheimer, he had an option in the 1950s to make a television adaption of the Stroud story, but CBS was warned off by the Federal Bureau of Prisons, and the project was dropped.

=== The Manchurian Candidate (1962) ===
Frankenheimer's 1962 political thriller The Manchurian Candidate is widely regarded as his most remarkable cinematic work. Biographer Gerald Prately observes that “the impact of this film was enormous. With it, John Frankenheimer became a force to be reckoned with in contemporary cinema; it established him as the most artistic, realistic and vital filmmaker at work in America or elsewhere.”

Frankenheimer and producer George Axelrod bought Richard Condon's 1959 novel after it had already been turned down by many Hollywood studios. After Frank Sinatra committed to the film, they secured backing from United Artists. The plot centers on Korean War veteran Raymond Shaw, part of a prominent political family. Shaw is brainwashed by Chinese and Russian captors after his Army platoon are imprisoned. He returns to civilian life in the United States, where he becomes an unwitting “sleeper” assassin in an international communist conspiracy to subvert and overthrow the U.S. government.

The film co-starred Laurence Harvey (as Sergeant Raymond Shaw), Janet Leigh, James Gregory and John McGiver. Angela Lansbury, as the mother and controller to her “sleeper” assassin son, garnered an Academy Award nomination for a “riveting” performance” in “the greatest screen role of her career.” Frank Sinatra, as Major Bennett Marco, who reverses Shaw's mind control mechanisms and exposes the conspiracy, delivers "what many feel is his best performance". Frankenheimer declared that both technically and conceptually, he had “complete control” over the production.

The technical “fluency” exhibited in The Manchurian Candidate reveals Frankenheimer's struggle to convey this Cold War narrative. Film historian Andrew Sarris remarked that the director was “obviously sweating over his technique...instead of building sequences, Frankenheimer explodes them prematurely, preventing his films from coming together coherently.” The Manchurian Candidate, nonetheless, conveys the “paranoia and delirium of the Cold War years” through its documentary-style mise-en-scène. A demonstration of Frankenheimer's bravura direction and “visual inventiveness” appears in the notable brainwashing sequence, presenting the sinister proceedings from the perspective of both the perpetrator and victim. The complexity of the sequence and its antecedents in television are described by film critic Stephen Bowie:

“The famous brainwashing sequence in which Frankenheimer moves seamlessly between an objective perspective (captured soldiers in a communist seminar) and a subjective one (the soldiers attending an innocuous meeting of the Ladies’ Garden Society). This tour de force was a pure distillation of Frankenheimer's television technique, opening with a self-conscious 360-degree pan that utilised the ‘wild’ sets which allowed TV cameras to move into seemingly impossible positions.”

In 1968, Frankenheimer acknowledged that the methods he used on television were “the same kind of style I used on The Manchurian Candidate. It was the first time I had the assurance and self-confidence to go back to what I had been really good at in television.” Compositionally, Frankenheimer concentrates his actors into “long lens” menage, in which dramatic interactions occur at close-up, mid-shot and long-shot, a configuration that he repeated “obsessively.” Film critic Stepen Bowie observes that “this style meant that Frankenheimer's early output became a cinema of exactitude rather than spontaneity.”

“More and more I think that our society is being manipulated and controlled...the most important aspect is that [in 1962] this country was just recovering from the McCarthy era and nothing had ever been filmed about it. I wanted to do a picture that showed how ludicrous the whole McCarthy far-Right syndrome was and how dangerous the far-Left syndrome is...The Manchurian Candidate dealt with the McCarthy era, the whole idea of fanaticism, the far-Right and the far-Left being really the same thing, and the idiocy of it. I wanted to show that and I think we did.”- John Frankenheimer in Gerald Pratley's The Cinema of John Frankenheimer (1969)

The Manchurian Candidate was released in the post-Red Scare period of the early 1960s, when anti-Communist political ideology still prevailed. Just one month after the film's release, the John F. Kennedy administration was in the midst of the Cuban Missile Crisis and nuclear brinkmanship with the Soviet Union.

That Frankenheimer and screenwriter Axelrod persisted in the production is a measure of their political liberalism, in a historical period when, according to biographer Gerald Pratley, “it was clearly dangerous to speak of politics in the out-spoken, satiric vein that characterized this picture.” Film critic David Walsh adds that “the level of conviction and urgency” that informs The Manchurian Candidate, reflects “the relative confidence and optimism American liberals felt in the early 1960s.” Frankenheimer's “terrifying parable” of the American political milieu was sufficiently well-received to avoid its summary rejection by distributors.

The Manchurian Candidate, due to its subject matter and its proximity to the Kennedy assassination is inextricably linked to that event. Frankenheimer acknowledged as much when, in 1968, he described The Manchurian Candidate as "a horribly prophetic film. It's frightening what's happened in our country since that film was made."

After completing The Manchurian Candidate, Frankenheimer recalls that he was determined to continue filmmaking: “I wanted to initiate the project, I wanted to have full control, I never wanted to go back to be hired as a director again.” He was offered a contract to direct a biopic about French singer Edith Piaf, with Natalie Wood in the starring role. He emphatically rejected the offer when he learned that Piaf's songs would be sung in English, rather than in the original French.

In 1963, Frankenheimer and screenwriter George Axelrod were introduced to the producer Edward Lewis, considering a TV production concerning the American Civil Liberties Union. When the project was deemed too expensive for television, Frankenheimer was approached by actor and producer Kirk Douglas, who was an associate of Lewis, to purchase and adapt to film the novel Seven Days in May by Fletcher Knebel and Charles W. Bailey II.

=== Seven Days in May (1964) ===
“Television screens, glimpsed throughout Seven Days in May, are one of the most recognisable Frankenheimer trademarks...Frankenheimer became the first filmmaker to acknowledge television's roles in modern society as an intrusion upon privacy and as a tool by which the powerful manipulate others.”—Film critic Stephen Bowie in John Frankenheimer Senses of Cinema (2006)

Seven Days in May (1964), based closely on Fletcher Knebel and Charles W. Bailey II's best-selling novel and a screenplay by Rod Serling, dramatizes an attempted military coup d’état in the United States, set in 1974. The perpetrators are led by General James M. Scott (Burt Lancaster), chairman of the Joint Chiefs of Staff (JCS), a virulently anti-Communist authoritarian. When US President Jordan Lyman (Fredric March) negotiates a nuclear disarmament treaty with the Soviet Union—an act that Scott considers treasonable—Scott mobilizes his military cabal. Operating at a remote base in West Texas, they prepare to commandeer the nation's communication networks and seize control of Congress. When Scott's JCS aide Colonel Martin “Jiggs” Casey (Kirk Douglas) discovers the planned coup, he is appalled, and convinces President Lyman as to the gravity of the threat. Lyman mobilizes his own governmental loyalists, and a clash over Constitutional principles between Lyman and Scott plays out in the Oval Office, with the President denouncing the General as a traitor to the US Constitution. When Scott is exposed publicly, his military supporters abandon him, and the conspiracy collapses. Frankenheimer points to the topical continuity of his political thrillers:

“Seven Days in May was as important to me as The Manchurian Candidate. I felt that the voice of the military was much too strong...the General MacArthur syndrome was very much in evidence...Seven Days in May was the opportunity to illustrate what a tremendous force the military-industrial complex is...we did not ask the Pentagon for co-operation because we knew we wouldn't get it.”

The character of General Scott has been identified by film historians as a composite of two leading military and political figures: Curtis LeMay and Edwin Walker. The film places great emphasis on the sanctity of US Constitutional norms as a bulwark against encroachments by anti-democratic elements in the United States. Biographer Gerald Pratley writes:

“An aspect to admire is Frankenheimer's use of speeches given by President Lyman. Scoffed by some critics as [reflecting] ‘respectable, liberal lines’, they are delivered by March with complete naturalism at times where they are logically called for, and with great honesty and conviction. They restate familiar [Constitutional] principles...Frankenheimer handles them pointedly but never in a propagandistic way…”

Film critic Joanne Laurier adds that “screenwriter Rod Serling and Frankenheimer's major theme is the need for the military to be subordinated to elected civilian rule.” As visual emphasis “the opening credits of Seven Days in May roll over an image of the original 1787 draft of the Constitution of the United States.

Seven Days in May has been widely praised for the high caliber of the performances by the cast. Biographer Charles Higham writes that “the film is played with extraordinary skill, proving that Frankenheimer's intensity communicated itself successfully to his actors.”

Frankenheimer, a former Air Force officer who worked briefly in the Pentagon, anticipated hostility from the military establishment to the premise of Seven Days in May. Indeed, internal memos circulated in the Federal Bureau of Investigation (FBI) registering alarm that Seven Days in May could potentially damage the bureau's reputation. Film critics Joanne Laurier and David Walsh report that "The military and FBI took a very definite note of Seven Days in May, revealing their intense sensitivity to such criticism. A memo uncovered in Ronald Reagan's FBI file reveals that the bureau was concerned the film would be used as Communist propaganda and was therefore ‘harmful to our Armed Forces and Nation.’" President Kennedy personally expressed approval for the film adaption, and his Press Secretary Pierre Salinger permitted Frankenheimer to view the Oval Office so as to sketch its interior.

Seven Days in May, filmed in the summer of 1963, was scheduled for release in December that year, but was delayed due to the assassination of President John F. Kennedy in November. The release of director Stanley Kubrick's satire Dr. Strangelove (1964) was similarly postponed. Frankenheimer recognized the “prophetic” aspects of his The Manchurian Candidate (1962), a film that examines conspiratorial political assassinations. The historical context in which Seven Days in May appeared inevitably links it to the 1963 Kennedy assassination. Film critic David Walsh makes the connection explicit: “By the time Seven Days in May reached movie theaters, Kennedy had been assassinated, in an operation widely believed to have been organized by those with CIA or military connections.”

Seven Days in May was well received by critics and movie-goers.

=== The Train (1964) ===
In early 1964, Frankenheimer was reluctant to embark upon another film project due to fatigue: "The Train is a film I had no intention of ever doing [and was] not a subject that I cared that much about...I'd just finished Seven Days in May (1964). I was quite tired."

Adapted from the memoir Le Front de l'Art: Défense des collections françaises, 1939–1945 by Rose Valland, the documentary-styled picture examines the desperate struggle by the French Resistance to intercept a train loaded with priceless art treasures and sabotage it before Wehrmacht officers could escape with it to Nazi Germany. The film dramatizes a contest of wills between French railway inspector Labiche (Burt Lancaster) and German art connoisseur Colonel von Waldheim (Paul Scofield), tasked with seizing the art work. Shooting for The Train had commenced in France when filmmaker Arthur Penn, originally enlisted to direct the adaptation, was dismissed by actor-producer Lancaster, allegedly over personal incompatibility and irreconcilable interpretive differences.

Frankenheimer, who had successfully directed Lancaster on three previous films, consented to replace Penn, but with grave reservations, considering the screenplay “almost appalling” and noting that “the damn train didn't leave the station until p. 140.” Frankenheimer postponed production of Seconds (1966) to accommodate Lancaster's production.

Filming for The Train was temporarily shut down and the existing footage discarded. Frankenheimer, in collaboration with screenwriters Nedrick Young (uncredited), Franklin Coen, Frank Davis and Walter Bernstein framed an entirely new script that combined suspense, intrigue and action, reflecting Lancaster's prerequisites.

“The point I wanted to make [in The Train] was that no work of art is worth a human life. That's what the film is about. I feel that very deeply. But to say that the film is a statement of a theme like that is really being unfair to the film...the lives of people, what they do and how they think, feel and behave, is in itself important...Honesty and reality are reflected in people's attitudes-without individuals having to perform great deeds or being great heroes or villains proclaiming great messages about life...The Train is this kind of movie.”—John Frankenheimer in Gerald Pratley's The Cinema of John Frankenheimer (1969).

Frankenheimer inserts an ethical question into the narrative: Is it justified to sacrifice a human life to save a work of art? His controversial answer was emphatically, no. Film critic Stephen Bowie observes ““Frankenheimer's thesis—that human life has more value than art—may seem simplistic, but it adds an essential moral component to what would otherwise be just an expensive live-action version of an electric train set.” The Train is lauded for its documentary-like realism and Frankenheimer's masterful integration of the human narrative with its tour-de-force action scenes.

"Smashing up trains was easy to do. It's every boy's childhood fantasy. There isn't a child who ever owned an electric train, who didn't want to do a wreck with it, putting a car across the track and sending an engine into it. Well of course, we did just that.”—John Frankenheimer in Gerald Pratley's The Cinema of John Frankenheimer (1969).

Biographer Gerald Pratley offers this appraisal of Frankenheimer's handling of the complex series of train sequences, discerning the influence of Soviet director Sergei Eisenstein:

“Frankenheimer's expert sense of narrative carries the events along with ever mounting drama and excitement, and at times overwhelming tragedy as men are shot and killed...he can wreck trains and stage air raids, and yet he sustains his characters on a high level of interest...Frankenheimer's insistence on using natural backgrounds gives a tremendous feeling of reality to the film. The stark, dramatic outlines of the camouflaged armored locomotive emerging from the sheds is worthy of Eisenstien; the chase into the tunnel showing the locomotive stopping inches from the opening, and the engineer pulling on the whistle chain, is masterly.”

Film critic Tim Palen elaborates on Frankenheimer's technical expertise in The Train: “The director makes excellent use of wide angle lenses, long tracking shots, and extreme close-ups whilst maintaining depth of field...deliberately ensures that elaborate camera movement and cutting was planned so that ‘logistically you knew where each train was,’ in relation to the action.” The Train exemplifies the centrality of technical applications that began to characterize Frankenheimer's approach to film in the late 1960s “brandishing style for its own sake.”

The Train’s original screenplay received an Academy Award nomination. It had cost $6.7 million. and was one of the 13 most popular films in the UK in 1965.

=== Seconds (1966) ===
Seconds, based on a novel by David Ely and with a screenplay by Lewis John Carlino, presents a surreal and disturbing tale of a disillusioned corporate executive, Arthur Hamilton (John Randolph). In an effort to escape his empty existence, he submits to a traumatic surgical procedure that transforms his body into that of a younger man, Tony Wilson (Rock Hudson). Randolph's effort to erase his former self in a new persona proves futile and leads to his horrific demise. Biographer Gerald Pratley describes Seconds as “a cold, grey, frightening picture of a dehumanized world...based on the age-old search for eternal youth...an amalgam of mystery, horror and science fiction…”

Frankenheimer explained his thematic objectives:

“An individual is what he is, and he has to live with his life. He cannot change anything, and all of today's literature and films about escapism are just rubbish because you cannot and should not ever escape from what you are. Your experience is what makes you the person that you are...That's really what the film is about. It's also about this nonsense in society that you must always be young, this accent on youth in advertising...I wanted to make a matter-of-fact yet horrifying portrait of big business that will do anything for anybody providing you are willing to pay for it [and] the belief that all you need to do in life is to be financially successful.”

Frankenheimer acknowledged his difficulty in casting for the elderly and demoralized Arthur Hamilton, which required the director to convincingly show his metamorphosis, both surgically and physiologically, into the youthful and artistic Tony Wilson. A dual role played by a single actor was considered, with Frankenheimer advocating for British actor Laurence Olivier. Paramount rejected this in favor of two players, in which one actor (Randolph) undergoes a radical transformation to emerge with the appearance and identity of the other (Hudson). Rock Hudson's portrayal of Wilson introduced a troubling plausibility issue that Frankenheimer fully recognized: “We knew we were going to have a terrible time getting audiences to believe that the man who went into the operating room (Randolph) could emerge as Rock Hudson, citing the physical disparity between the actors as problematic. Film historian Gerald Pratley concurs: “the weakness [in Seconds] is trying to convince audiences that the actor playing Hamilton could emerge, after plastic surgery, as Wilson in the form of Rock Hudson. This is where the star system has worked against Frankeheimer.”

Frankenheimer identified the source of the film's weakness less as the physical disparities in his actors, and more as his difficulties in conveying the themes required to explain Wilson's inability to adjust socially to his new life: "We thought we had shown why [Wilson] failed, but after the film was finished I realized we had not."

Frankenheimer's technical prowess is on display in Seconds, where the director and his cameraman James Wong Howe experimented with various lenses, including the 9.5 mm fisheye lens to achieve the "distortion and exaggeration" that would dramatize Hamilton's struggle to "break free of his emotional straightjacket".

Howe and Frankenheimer's use of visual distortions are central to revealing his character's hallucinatory mental states, and according to Frankenheimer “almost psychedelic”. In one scene, a total of four Arriflexes are brought to bear to emphasis Hamilton's sexual impotency with his estranged wife. Film historian Peter Wilshire considers Frankenheimer's choice of James Wong Howe as cameraman for the project was his “most important directional decision.” Howe was nominated at the Academy Awards in Best Cinematography for his efforts.

At Frankenheimer's urging, Paramount executives agreed to enter Seconds at the 1966 Cannes Film Festival, hoping the film might confer prestige on the studio and enhance box office returns. On the contrary, Seconds was savaged by European critics at the film competition, regarding it as misanthropic and “cruel”. Frankenheimer recalled “it was a disaster” and declined to attend the festival's post-preview press conference. In the aftermath of this fiasco, Paramount withdraw promotional resources, and Seconds failed at the box office. As consolation for its critical and commercial failures, Seconds was ultimately rewarded with a cult following among cineastes.

Critical appraisal of the film has varied widely. Gerald Pratley, in 1968, declares that Seconds, despite its poor reception in 1966, will one day be recognized as “a masterpiece.” Film critic Peter Wilshire offers qualified praise: “In spite of its obvious weaknesses, Seconds is an extremely complex, innovative, and ambitious film.” Brian Baxter disparages Seconds as “embarrassing...unconvincing, even as science fiction.” and critic David Walsh considers Seconds “particularly wrongheaded, strained and foolish.” Biographer Charles Higham writes:

“Seconds, superbly shot by James Wong Howe...fails to achieve the political portrait of the California rich which would have made it a triumph. The important central passages at Malibu have all the softness of a dream-come-true. By conspiring with his own target, Frankenheimer shows that corruption has crept up on him. Not even a powerful climax—the hero preferring death in New York to ‘life’ in Malibu, returning to be killed in a horrifying operating room scene—alters the fact that the film has been compromised.”

=== Grand Prix (1966) ===
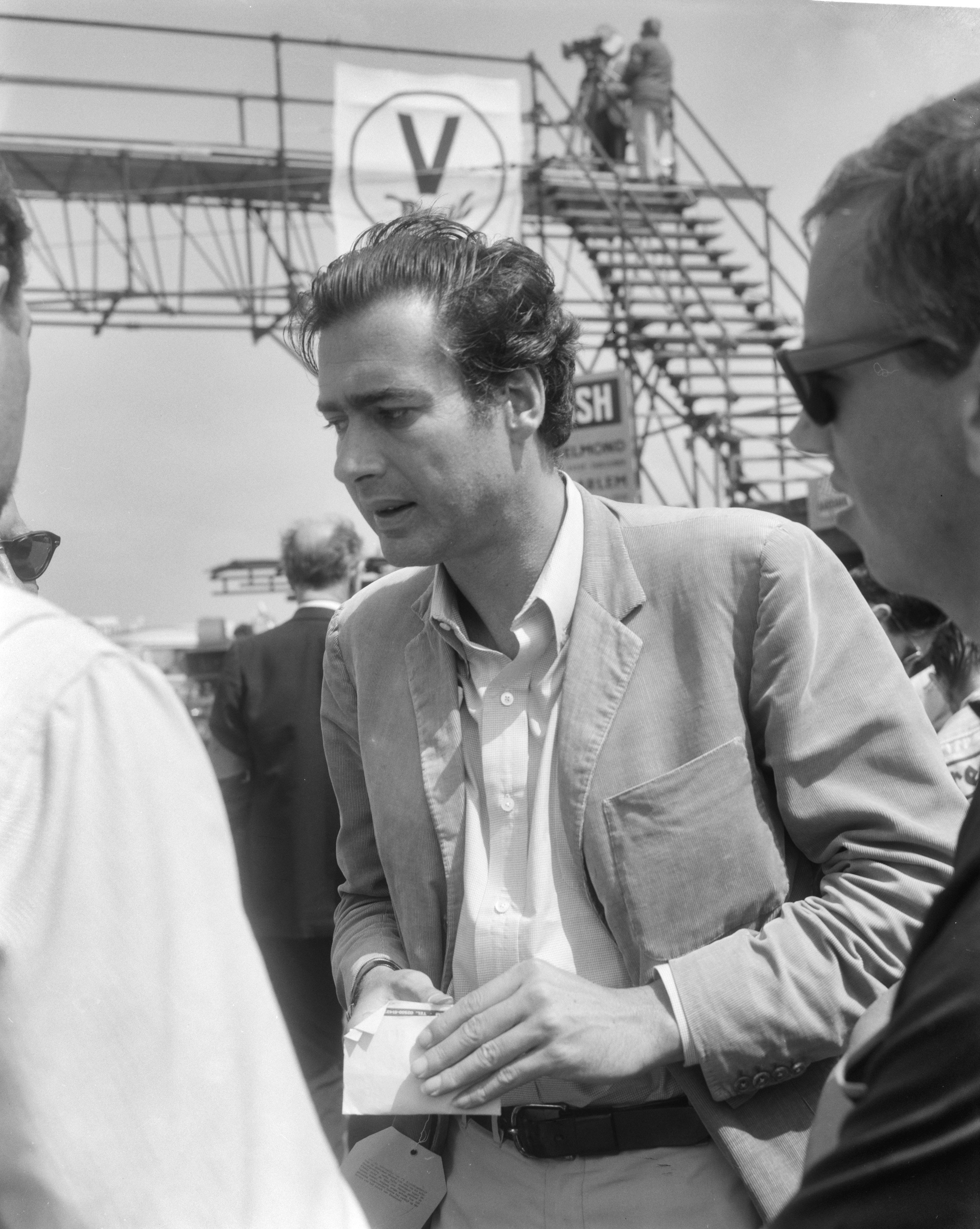
Frankenheimer on the set of Grand Prix

By the mid-sixties, Frankenheimer had emerged as one of Hollywood's leading directors. As such, M-G-M provided lavish financing for Grand Prix (1966), Frankenheimer's first color film and shot in 70mm Cinerama. A former amateur race car driver himself, he approached the project with genuine enthusiasm.

The screenplay by Robert Alan Aurthur and an uncredited Frankenheimer, concerns the professional and personal fortunes of Formula One racer Pete Aron (James Garner) during an entire season of competitive racing. The action climaxes at Monza, where Aron, Scott Stoddard (Brian Bedford), Jean Pierre Sarti (Yves Montand) and Nino Barlini (Antonio Sabàto Sr.) compete for the championship, with tragic results.

Hoping to create a realistic rendering of racing and its environment, he used several innovative film techniques using different tools and special effects. Together with cinematographer Lionel Lindon, Frankenheimer mounted cameras directly onto the race cars, eliminating process shots and providing audiences with a driver's-eye view of the action.

Frankenheimer incorporated split-screens to juxtapose documentary-like interviews of the racers with high-speed action shots on the track. Frankenheimer explains his use of the “hydrogen cannon”:

“The special effects, the accidents, were very hard to do. I had an excellent special effects man, Milton Rice, who devised a hydrogen cannon which worked on the principle of a pea shooter. The car was attached to a shaft and when the hydrogen exploded the car was literally propelled through the air like a projectile at about 125 to 135 miles an hour and you could aim it anywhere you wanted it to go. And all the wrecks were done that way. They were real cars. No models at all. Everything was very real. And that's why it was good…”

“I'm not saying it's my best film. But it is certainly one of the most satisfactory film I’ve made...to be able to indulge your fantasies with ten-and-a-half million dollars is, I think, marvelous.”—John Frankenheimer on Grand Prix in Gerald Pratley's The Cinema of John Frankenheimer(1969)

Characterized largely by Frankenheimer's bravura application of his striking cinematic style, Grand Prix has been termed “largely a technical exercise” by film critic David Walsh and “brandishing style for its own sake” according to The Film Encyclopedia. Film historian Andrew Sarris observed that Frankenheimer's style had “degenerated into an all-embracing academicism, a veritable glossary of film techniques.”

A commercial success, Grand Prix garnered three Oscars at the Academy Awards for Best Sound Effects (by Gordon Daniel), Best Editing (Henry Berman, Stu Linder and Frank Santillo), and for Best Sound Recording (Franklin Milton and Roy Charman).

=== The Extraordinary Seaman (1969) ===
Frankenheimer's first foray into “light comedy” represents a major departure from his often dystopian and dramatic work addressing social issues and his big budget action films. The Extraordinary Seaman presents a menagerie of misfit characters set in the final days of World War II in the Pacific theatre. British Lt. Commander Finchhaven, RN (David Niven), a ghost, is condemned to a Flying Dutchman-like existence, roaming the seas in his ship Curmudgeon in search of redemption for his shameful ineptitude during a World War I combat mission. During World War II, the Curmudgeon is chartered, then beached on a remote Pacific Island by party goers. Four castaway American sailors stumble upon the unseaworthy vessel: Lt. Morton Krim (Alan Alda), Cook 3/C W.W. J. Oglethorpe (Mickey Rooney), Gunner's Mate Orville Toole (Jack Carter) and Seaman 1/C Lightfoot Star (Manu Tupou). Jennifer Winslow (Faye Dunaway), the proprietor of a jungle garage, provides supplies to repair the derelict Curmudgeon for passage off the island. Commander Finchaven enlists the largely incompetent crew to seek out and sink a Japanese battleship and thus vindicate his family honor. The 79-minute picture depicts the crew's subsequent “hazards and misadventures.” The Extraordinary Seaman, based on a screenplay and story by Phillip Rock, is a spoof of war-time conventions and clichés which integrates newsreel clips from the period for comic effect.

“I don't think you can make an anti-war film by killing a lot of people and by showing ‘how horrible war is’ in the last five minutes after you’ve had two hours of fun with machine guns and bombs...I mean, one of the most atrocious war films ever made is The Green Berets (1968). I'm against violence like this...I think it's totally wrong that at the end of it they try to justify all this violence by some pretentious statement. I will not make a film like that. I don't believe in it.”—John Frankenheimer in Gerald Pratley's The Cinema of John Frankenheimer (1969)

Frankenheimer engages in a mock-heroic burlesque, titling the film's episodes “Grand Alliance”, “The Gathering Storm”, “Their Finest Hour”, The Hinge of Fate” and “Triumph and Tragedy”, borrowed from Winston Churchill's post-war memoirs.

Filmed during the Vietnam War, film historian Gerald Pratley discerns “a strong thematic relationship” between Frankenheimer's opposition to US invasion of Indo-China and The Extraordinary Seaman. Frankenheimer recalls that he and screenwriter Phillip Rock “decided we could really use this premise [of a ghostly naval officer] to make an anti-war statement. I think we did, and it terrified MGM."

Metro-Goldwyn-Mayer delayed the release of the film for two years, reportedly due its poor response among critics and “dismal screenings”, though Frankenheimer attributes the delay to legalities obtaining release of historic newsreel footage. The studio made only perfunctory efforts to promote and exhibit the film after The Extraordinary Seaman's poor critical reviews and weak box-office response.

=== The Fixer (1968) ===
Frankenheimer approached his film adaption of Bernard Malamud's The Fixer with alacrity, obtaining the galleys for the 1966 novel in advance of its publication. The Fixer is based on the 1913 persecution and trial of the Jewish peasant Menahem Mendel Beilis, accused of Blood Libel during the reign of Czar Nicholas II

The Fixer was widely praised by movie critics for Frankenheimer's success in eliciting outstanding performances from Alan Bates as the brutalized Yakov Shepsovitch Bok, Dirk Bogarde as Boris Bibikov, his humane court appointed defense attorney, and David Warner as Count Odoevsky. Minister of Justice. Bates received his only Academy Award nomination for Best Actor in this role. Renata Adler of The New York Times observed "the direction, by John Frankenheimer, is powerful and discreet. It averts its eyes at the easy, ugly consummations of violence...and gives you credit for imagining the result." This, despite Frankenheimer's admission that "there is a very violent scene in The Fixer":

"You have to show what this man [Bok] went through in five years of prison, and what his captors did to him. The executives at Metro were worried about this one scene. They said ‘with the climate of today it is dangerous to show this.’ I said ‘it has to be in there.’ This is the scene where the Russians come and beat him for refusing to be converted to Christianity...it is not a scene of violence just put there for its own sake. I hope the audience feels this...I don't believe in violence for the sake of exploitation."

“The Fixer investigates the fact that the victory Yakov Bok won was being brought to trial...the Minister of Justice, Count Odoevsky, offers Bok a pardon. And Bok says ‘no’...That, I think, is probably the best scene in the film...The Fixer is about the dignity of a human being who never knew he had this strength in him, and suddenly finds it within him...Bok is not a [literary] man. He's a peasant and you see this great strength developed within him. That's what the film is about. It has nothing to do with the fact that he is a Jew. It could be any man, any time, anywhere...I think this is a very good story to tell.”—John Frankenheimer in Gerald Pratley's The Cinema of John Frankenheimer (1969)

Whereas Frankenheimer was deeply gratified with his cinematic handling of Malamud's Pulitzer Prize–winning work, declaring "I feel better about The Fixer than anything I've ever done in my life", a number of movie critics registered severe critiques. Film critic Roger Ebert wrote:

"Frankenheimer's task was to make a film that, in itself, would make a moral statement. He has failed. The film has little reality of its own; instead, it draws its power and emotion from the raw material of its subject matter...The temptation is to praise the film because we agree with its message. This is the same critical fallacy that led to praise of Judgment at Nuremberg (1961)—a corrupt, commercial film—because we disapproved of Nazi war crimes, A movie doesn't become good simply by taking the correct ideological position."

Ebert adds: "What were needed were fewer self-conscious humanistic speeches... Frankenheimer should have shown us his hero's suffering, and the Kafkaesque legal tortures of the state, without commenting on them."

Film critic Renata Adler singles out screenwriter and blacklist victim Dalton Trumbo for disparagement:

“The triviality of the script by Dalton Trumbo, the old sentimental Hollywood formula (a few moments of mild happiness, an hour and a half of reversals and misery, with violins, a blitz happy ending with drums) applies, almost intact, to dog stories, horse stories, sports stories, love stories.”

Adler concludes: "it is not enough to put [Bok-Bates] in a few cliché predicaments...[the dialogue] becomes demeaning and vulgar when drawn out with hack-plot fiction approximations of eloquence." Biographer Charles Higham dismisses the film, writing that "since the commercial failure of Seconds (1966), Frankenheimer's films have been mediocre, ranging from The Fixer (1968) to The Horsemen (1971)."

Frankenheimer became a close friend of Senator Robert F. Kennedy during the making of The Manchurian Candidate in 1962. In 1968, Kennedy, who hoped to become the Democratic presidential candidate that year, asked him to make some commercials for use in the presidential campaign. On the night the Senator was assassinated in June 1968, Frankenheimer had driven him from Los Angeles Airport to the Ambassador Hotel for his acceptance speech.

The Gypsy Moths was a romantic drama about a troupe of barnstorming skydivers and their impact on a small midwestern town. The celebration of Americana starred Frankenheimer regular Lancaster, reuniting him with From Here to Eternity co-star Deborah Kerr, and it also featured Gene Hackman. The film failed to find an audience, but Frankenheimer claimed it was one of his favorites.

=== 1970s ===
Frankenheimer followed this with I Walk the Line in 1970. The film, starring Gregory Peck and Tuesday Weld, about a Tennessee sheriff who falls in love with a moonshiner's daughter, was set to songs by Johnny Cash. Frankenheimer's next project took him to Afghanistan. The Horsemen focused on the relationship between a father and son, played by Jack Palance and Omar Sharif. Sharif's character, an expert horseman, played the Afghan national sport of buzkashi.

Impossible Object, also known as Story of a Love Story, suffered distribution difficulties and was not widely released. Next came a four-hour film of O'Neill's The Iceman Cometh, in 1973, starring Lee Marvin, and the decidedly offbeat 99 and 44/100% Dead, a crime black comedy starring Richard Harris.

With his fluent French and knowledge of French culture, Frankenheimer was asked to direct French Connection II, set entirely in Marseille. With Hackman reprising his role as New York cop Popeye Doyle, the film was a success and got Frankenheimer his next job. Black Sunday, based on author Thomas Harris's only non-Hannibal Lecter novel up to that point, involves an Israeli Mossad agent (Robert Shaw) chasing a pro-Palestinian terrorist (Marthe Keller) and a PTSD-afflicted Vietnam vet (Bruce Dern), who plan a spectacular mass murder involving the Goodyear Blimp which flies over the Super Bowl. It was shot on location at the actual Super Bowl X in January 1976 in Miami, with the use of a real Goodyear Blimp. The film tested very highly, and Paramount and Frankenheimer had high expectations for it, but it was not a hit (with Paramount blaming the failure on the special effects work in the climax, and Universal Studios releasing the similarly themed thriller Two-Minute Warning only six months prior).

In 1977, Carter DeHaven hired Frankenheimer to direct William Sackheim and Michael Kozoll's screenplay for First Blood. After considering Michael Douglas, Powers Boothe, and Nick Nolte for the role of John Rambo, Frankenheimer cast Brad Davis. He also cast George C. Scott as Colonel Trautman. However, the production was abandoned after Orion Pictures acquired its distributor Filmways, and Sackheim and Kozoll's script would be rewritten by Sylvester Stallone as the basis for Ted Kotcheff's 1982 film.

Frankenheimer is quoted in Champlin's biography as saying that his alcohol problem caused him to do work that was below his own standards on Prophecy (1979), an ecological monster movie about a mutant grizzly bear terrorizing a forest in Maine.

=== 1980s ===
In 1981, Frankenheimer travelled to Japan to shoot the cult martial-arts action film The Challenge, with Scott Glenn and Japanese actor Toshiro Mifune. He told Champlin that his drinking became so severe while shooting in Japan that he actually drank on set, which he had never done before, and as a result he entered rehab on returning to America. The film was released in 1982, along with his HBO television adaptation of the acclaimed play The Rainmaker.

In 1985, Frankenheimer directed an adaptation of the Robert Ludlum bestseller The Holcroft Covenant, starring Michael Caine. That was followed the next year with another adaptation, 52 Pick-Up, from the novel by Elmore Leonard. Dead Bang (1989) followed Don Johnson as he infiltrated a group of white supremacists. In 1990, he returned to the Cold War political thriller genre with The Fourth War with Roy Scheider (with whom Frankenheimer had worked previously on 52 Pick-Up) as a loose cannon Army colonel drawn into a dangerous personal war with a Soviet officer. It was not a commercial success.

=== 1990s ===
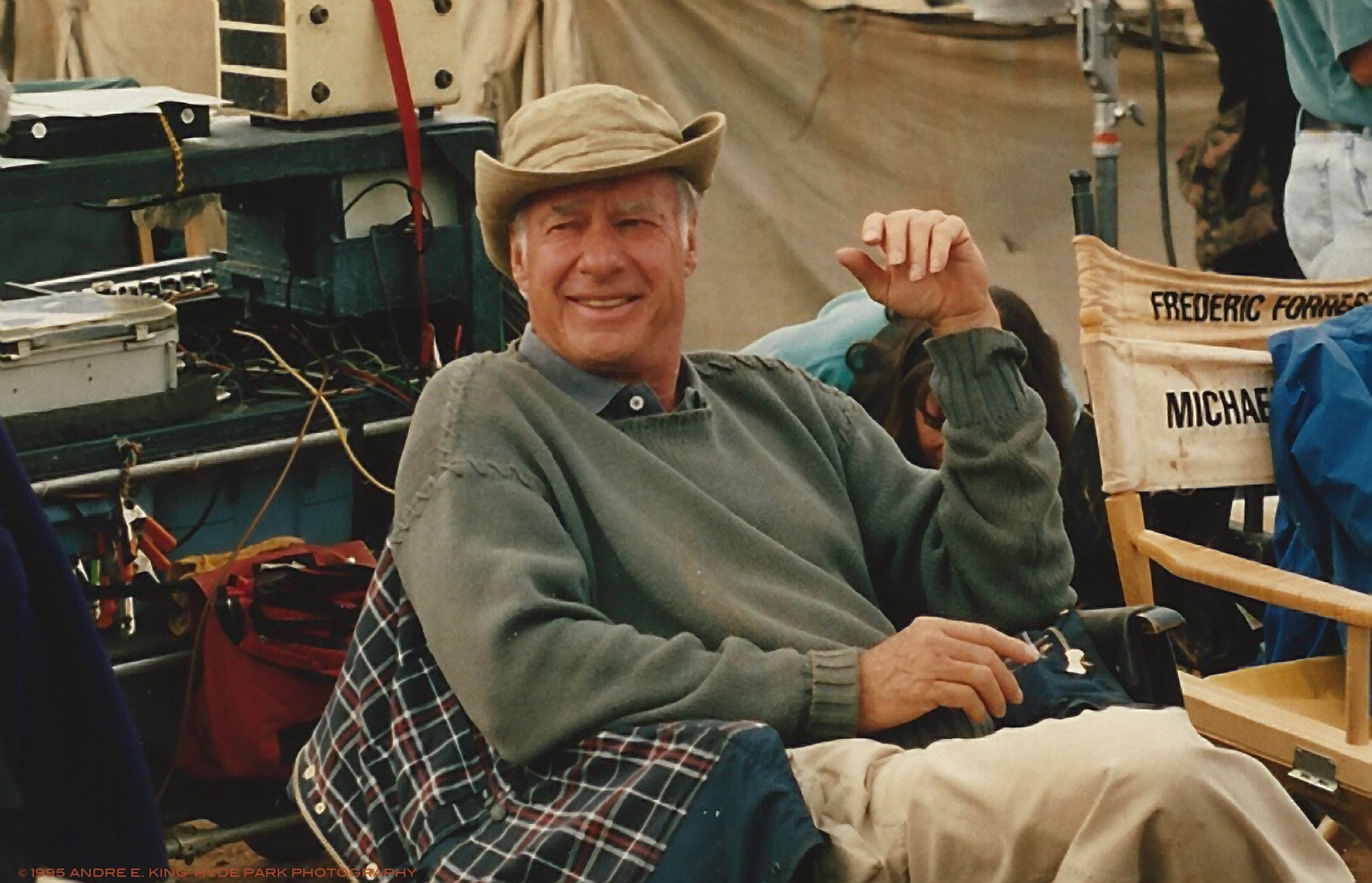
Frankenheimer on the set of the television film Andersonville in 1994

Most of his 1980s films were less than successful, both critically and financially, but Frankenheimer was able to make a comeback in the 1990s by returning to his roots in television. He directed two films for HBO in 1994: Against the Wall and The Burning Season that won him several awards and renewed acclaim. The director also helmed two films for Turner Network Television, Andersonville (1996) and George Wallace (1997), that were highly praised.

Frankenheimer's 1996 film The Island of Doctor Moreau, which he took over after the firing of original director Richard Stanley, was the cause of countless stories of production woes and personality clashes and received scathing reviews. Frankenheimer was said to be unable to stand Val Kilmer, the young co-star of the film and whose disruption had reportedly led to the removal of Stanley half a week into production. When Kilmer's last scene was completed, Frankenheimer reportedly said, "Now get that bastard off my set." He also stated, "There are two things I will never ever do in my whole life: I will never climb Mt. Everest and I will never work with Val Kilmer ever again." The veteran director also professed that "Will Rogers never met Val Kilmer". In an interview, Frankenheimer refused to discuss the film, saying only that he had a miserable time making it.

However, his next film, 1998's Ronin, starring Robert De Niro, was a return to form, featuring Frankenheimer's now trademark elaborate car chases woven into a labyrinthine espionage plot. Co-starring an international cast including Jean Reno and Jonathan Pryce, it was a critical and box-office success. As the 1990s drew to a close, he even had a rare acting role, appearing in a cameo as a U.S. general in The General's Daughter (1999). He earlier had an uncredited cameo as a TV director in his 1977 film Black Sunday.

=== Last years and death ===
Frankenheimer's last theatrical film, 2000's Reindeer Games, starring Ben Affleck, underperformed. In 2001, he worked on the BMW action short-film Ambush for the promotional series The Hire, starring Clive Owen. Frankenheimer's final film, Path to War (2002) for HBO was nominated for numerous awards. A look back at the Vietnam War, it starred Michael Gambon as President Lyndon Johnson along with Alec Baldwin and Donald Sutherland.

Frankenheimer was scheduled to direct Exorcist: The Beginning, but it was announced before filming started that he was withdrawing, citing health concerns. Paul Schrader replaced him. About a month later he died suddenly in Los Angeles, California, from a stroke due to complications following spinal surgery at the age of 72.

== Politics ==
Frankenheimer was born into a politically conservative family and attended a Catholic military academy. He served as a junior officer in the US Air Force during the Korean War. In his youth, he briefly considered entering the priesthood.

He came of age during the height of the Red Scare and the Anti-Communist House Un-American Activities Committee investigations during the early 1950s, a period that saw the blacklisting of left-wing filmmakers and screenwriters by the Hollywood studios. Frankenheimer's early liberal political sensibilities first manifested themselves in disputes with his conservative father, a stockbroker:

When I was in high school, I started disagreeing a lot with my father on politics, because he was really very conservative. He really wanted the status quo, and I didn't want the status quo. The whole racial question really, really bothered me. I came from New York, and one of my first girlfriends was an African-American dancer. And this caused a furor of sorts within my family.

Frankenheimer's “liberal sensibility” emerged professionally when he began his apprenticeship in the early TV industry:

When I got into live television [in 1952], there was the whole business of McCarthy—you can't imagine how terrible that was. That really galvanized me into a political arena. And of course in live television it was very hard to do political stuff because there was the blacklist. You could do anything psychological, but nothing sociological.

Film critic David Walsh notes that “any medium which emerged as the profit-driven property of large American corporations and under the close scrutiny of the US authorities in the midst of the Cold War, with its anticommunism, conformism and generally stagnant intellectual climate, would inevitably be deformed by those processes...Frankenheimer worked and apparently thrived within this overall artistic and ideological framework.”

=== Political relationships with the Kennedys ===
In a 1998 interview with film critic Alex Simon, Frankenheimer recalled that his first contact with Kennedy family politics occurred during the 1960 presidential campaigns:

I was probably the best-known television director around. And I was approached to do some work for John Kennedy. And I don't know...I was 30 years old. I was going through a divorce [with wife Carolyn Miller], and I just didn't want to deal with it, so I said no.

In light of Kennedy's assassination in November 1963, Frankenheimer lamented, "Then he was killed, and I'd always felt guilty about not having done that work for him early on."

During his filming of The Manchurian Candidate (1962), Frankenheimer reports that he and producer/screenwriter George Axelrod were anxious that the Kennedy administration might object to the plot, which graphically depicts an assassination attempt on a liberal presidential candidate by a right-wing conspiracy. When cast member Frank Sinatra, a personal friend of Kennedy, was sent to sound out his reaction to the film, Kennedy (who had read the Richard Condon novel) responded enthusiastically: "I love The Manchurian Candidate. Who's going to play the mother?"

“...There is no such thing as an unpolitical man. You have to take a stand in life. I was very impressed with and devoted to Senator Robert Kennedy. I believe in what he stood for...I arranged, supervised and directed all his television film appearances. I dedicated myself to that in full...his death was an irreplaceable loss...I think he represented everything that was good in this country. And there's been a terrible void since he was killed.” - John Frankenheimer in Gerald Pratley's The Cinema of John Frankenheimer (1969)

When Frankenheimer began pre-production on his political thriller Seven Days in May (1964) in the summer of 1963, he approached Kennedy's press secretary, Pierre Salinger, to arrange to film a segment on location in vicinity of the White House. The story concerns a political coup organized by a fascistic Chairman of the Joint Chiefs of Staff (played by Burt Lancaster) to depose the liberal president (played by Fredric March) and install a military dictatorship. Kennedy approved the picture and accommodated Frankenheimer by withdrawing to his home in Hyannisport for the weekend during the White House shoot.

As to whether Frankenheimer ever met Kennedy, the director offered contradictory versions. To biographer Gerald Pratley in 1968, Frankenheimer said, "I never had the pleasure of meeting [JFK] personally" but noted that Kennedy had fully supported the production of Seven Days in May. In 1998, during an interview with film critic Alex Simon, Frankenheimer recalled that Kennedy purportedly said to Salinger, "if it's John Frankenheimer [directing Seven Days in May] I want to meet him." Frankenheimer adds, “So I met him, went to a press conference with him. He was wonderful to me.”

Frankenheimer regarded Kennedy's assassination as a profound calamity for America: “I think we lost our innocence as a country with John F. Kennedy's death.”

Film critics Joanne Laurier and David Walsh observe that “The Kennedy assassination marked a historical turning point. One of its aims, in which it ultimately succeeded, was to shift US government policies to the right and intimidate political opposition.”

Frankenheimer's most significant bond with the Kennedys was his political and personal relationship with Senator Robert F. Kennedy, to whom he quickly committed his services during the 1968 presidential campaign: “When [Robert Kennedy] declared his candidacy in '68, I immediately called [campaign manager] Pierre Salinger and said ‘Pierre, I want to be part of this.’"

Frankenheimer reports that he filmed Robert Kennedy's campaign appearances and coached the senator on improving his political persona, providing this support for Kennedy over three months in the spring of 1968.

Frankenheimer was devastated by RFK's assassination in June 1968, due in part to his proximity to the event. Kennedy spent the night before the California primary in Frankenheimer's Malibu home. He had first been scheduled to accompany Kennedy through the Ambassador Hotel after the candidate's victory speech in the California primaries. Early news reports listed Frankenheimer as one of the wounded in Kennedy's entourage. Frankenheimer and spouse Evans Evans were waiting at a side entrance of the Ambassador Hotel to pick up Kennedy when he emerged from the press conference and drive him to their home. According to Frankenheimer, they witnessed police removing Sirhan Sirhan, later convicted of the shooting, from the premises, then discovered Kennedy had been mortally wounded.

Traumatized by the event, Frankenheimer withdrew from politics, and after completing The Gypsy Moths (1969) moved to France to study the culinary arts. He recalled in 1998: “Yeah. I managed to finish one film, The Gypsy Moths, but I just felt like 'What's the point? What does any of this really matter?' I mean, when you're a part of something like that and then all of the sudden it's taken away with just one bullet [snaps fingers]. It really makes you take stock in what's important...That's when I went to France, and that's when I went to Le Cordon Bleu, because I just had to do something else with my life, and I really couldn't go near politics for a long time after that.” Walsh comments:

Frankenheimer's social concerns largely disappeared from his work for the next two decades. He became identified more and more as an "action director" with competent and uninspired works such as French Connection II (1975) and Black Sunday (1977). The first is memorable principally for the strain of violence, indeed sadistic violence, which appears in Frankenheimer's work. This reached something of a height in the grisly and pointless 52 Pick-Up (1986) and endured in Frankenheimer's work through his final feature films, including Ronin (1998) and Reindeer Games (2000).

== Personal life ==
He was married to Carolyn Miller from 1954 to 1962, and they had two daughters, Elise and Kristi. He then married actress Evans Evans in 1963, and they remained married until his death.

=== Death ===
Frankenheimer died in Los Angeles on July 6, 2002, aged 72, from a stroke due to complications following spinal surgery.

The films Exorcist: The Beginning (which he'd been scheduled to direct before dropping out) and The Butterfly Effect 2 were dedicated to his memory.

== Archive ==
The moving image collection of John Frankenheimer is held at the Academy Film Archive.

== Filmography ==
=== Film ===
Year	Title	Director	Producer	Notes
1957	The Young Stranger	Yes	No	
1961	The Young Savages	Yes	No	
1962	All Fall Down	Yes	No	
1962	Birdman of Alcatraz	Yes	No	
1962	The Manchurian Candidate	Yes	Yes	
1964	Seven Days in May	Yes	Executive	
1964	The Train	Yes	No	Replaced Arthur Penn
1966	Seconds	Yes	Executive	
1966	Grand Prix	Yes	Executive	
1968	The Fixer	Yes	No	
1969	The Extraordinary Seaman	Yes	No	
1969	The Gypsy Moths	Yes	No	
1970	I Walk the Line	Yes	No	
1971	The Horsemen	Yes	Yes	
1973	The Iceman Cometh	Yes	No	
1973	Impossible Object	Yes	No	aka The Story of a Love Story
1974	99 and 44/100% Dead	Yes	No	
1975	French Connection II	Yes	No	
1977	Black Sunday	Yes	No	
1979	Prophecy	Yes	No	
1982	The Challenge	Yes	No	
1985	The Holcroft Covenant	Yes	No	
1986	52 Pick-Up	Yes	No	
1989	Dead Bang	Yes	No	
1990	The Fourth War	Yes	No	
1991	Year of the Gun	Yes	No	
1996	The Island of Dr. Moreau	Yes	No	Replaced Richard Stanley
1998	Ronin	Yes	No	
2000	Reindeer Games	Yes	No	
2001	The Hire: Ambush	Yes	No	Promotional short film for BMW

=== Television ===
Year	Title	Director	Producer	Notes
1954	You Are There	Yes	No	Episode: "The Plot Against King Solomon"
1954–55	Danger	Yes	No	6 episodes
1955–56	Climax!	Yes	No	26 episodes
1956–60	Playhouse 90	Yes	No	27 episodes
1958	Studio One in Hollywood	Yes	No	Episode: "The Last Summer"
1959	DuPont Show of the Month	Yes	No	Episode: "The Browning Vision"
1959	Startime	Yes	Yes	Episode: "The Turn of the Screw"
1959–60	NBC Sunday Showcase	Yes	Yes	2 episodes
1960	Buick-Electra Playhouse	Yes	No	3 episodes
1964	Selena	Yes	No	Presentation pilot
1992	Tales from the Crypt	Yes	No	Episode: "Maniac at Large"

TV movies

Year	Title	Director	Producer
1982	The Rainmaker	Yes	No
1994	Against the Wall	Yes	No
1994	The Burning Season	Yes	Yes
1996	Andersonville	Yes	Executive
1997	George Wallace	Yes	Yes
2002	Path to War	Yes	Executive

== Awards and honors ==
Institution	Year	Category	Work	Result
CableACE Awards	1983	Directing a Theatrical-Non-Musical Program	The Rainmaker	Nominated
CableACE Awards	1995	Movie or Miniseries	The Burning Season	Nominated
CableACE Awards	1995	Directing a Movie or Miniseries	The Burning Season	Won
CableACE Awards	1995	Directing a Movie or Miniseries	Against the Wall	Nominated
CableACE Awards	1997	Movie or Miniseries	George Wallace	Won
CableACE Awards	1997	Directing a Movie or Miniseries	George Wallace	Won
Cannes Film Festival	1962	Palme d'Or	All Fall Down	Nominated
Cannes Film Festival	1966	Palme d'Or	Seconds	Nominated
Deauville American Film Festival	1991	Critics Award	Year of the Gun	Nominated
Directors Guild of America	1963	Outstanding Directorial Achievement in Theatrical Feature Film	The Manchurian Candidate	Nominated
Directors Guild of America	1963	Outstanding Directorial Achievement in Theatrical Feature Film	Birdman of Alcatraz	Nominated
Directors Guild of America	1967	Outstanding Directorial Achievement in Theatrical Feature Film	Grand Prix	Nominated
Directors Guild of America	1995	Outstanding Directorial Achievement in Movies for Television and Limited Series	Against the Wall	Nominated
Directors Guild of America	1997	Outstanding Directorial Achievement in Movies for Television and Limited Series	Andersonville	Nominated
Directors Guild of America	1998	Outstanding Directorial Achievement in Movies for Television and Limited Series	George Wallace	Nominated
Directors Guild of America	2003	Outstanding Directorial Achievement in Movies for Television and Limited Series	Path to War	Nominated
Primetime Emmy Awards	1956	Outstanding Directing for a Drama Series	Climax! ("Portrait in Celluloid")	Nominated
Primetime Emmy Awards	1957	Outstanding Directing for a Drama Series	Playhouse 90 ("Forbidden Area")	Nominated
Primetime Emmy Awards	1958	Outstanding Directing for a Drama Series	Playhouse 90 ("The Comedian")	Nominated
Primetime Emmy Awards	1959	Outstanding Directing for a Drama Series	Playhouse 90 ("A Town Has Turned to Dust")	Nominated
Primetime Emmy Awards	1960	Outstanding Directing for a Drama Series	Startime ("The Turn of the Screw")	Nominated
Primetime Emmy Awards	1994	Outstanding Directing for a Limited Series or Movie	Against the Wall	Won
Primetime Emmy Awards	1995	Outstanding Limited Series or Movie	The Burning Season	Nominated
Primetime Emmy Awards	1995	Outstanding Directing for a Limited Series or Movie	The Burning Season	Won
Primetime Emmy Awards	1996	Outstanding Limited Series or Movie	Andersonville	Nominated
Primetime Emmy Awards	1996	Outstanding Directing for a Limited Series or Movie	Andersonville	Won
Primetime Emmy Awards	1998	Outstanding Limited Series or Movie	George Wallace	Nominated
Primetime Emmy Awards	1998	Outstanding Directing for a Limited Series or Movie	George Wallace	Won
Primetime Emmy Awards	2002	Outstanding Limited Series or Movie	Path to War	Nominated
Primetime Emmy Awards	2002	Outstanding Directing for a Limited Series or Movie	Path to War	Nominated
Golden Globe Awards	1963	Best Director	The Manchurian Candidate	Nominated
Golden Globe Awards	1965	Best Director	Seven Days in May	Nominated
Golden Raspberry Awards	1997	Worst Director	The Island of Dr. Moreau	Nominated
Hugo Awards	1960	Best Dramatic Presentation	Startime ("The Turn of the Screw")	Nominated
National Board of Review	1999	Billy Wilder Award for Excellence in Directing	—N/a	Won
Valladolid International Film Festival	1969	Best Film	The Fixer	Nominated
Venice Film Festival	1962	Golden Lion	Birdman of Alcatraz	Nominated
Venice Film Festival	1962	San Giorgio Prize	Birdman of Alcatraz	Won

Frankenheimer was also a member of the Television Hall of Fame, and was inducted in 2002.

== Bibliography ==
- Abele, Robert. 2018. The Cost of War: Guillermo del Toro revels in the proficiency and poignancy of John Frankenheimer's intimate WWII epic The Train. Directors Guild of America. Winter, 2018. Retrieved 26 July 2021.
- Adler, Renata. 1968. Screen: 'The Fixer' Put Through Hollywood Mill: Frankenheimer Directs From Malamud Novel, Alan Bates Plays Lead -- Bogarde in Cast. The New York Times. Screen: 'The Fixer' Put Through Hollywood Mill:Frankenheimer Directs From Malamud Novel Alan Bates Plays Lead -- Bogarde in Cast Retrieved 15 August 2021.
- American Film Institute. 2021. The Extraordinary Seaman. AFI Catalog of Feature Films. American Film Institute (AFI). AFI|Catalog Retrieved 31 July 2021.
- Axmaker. Sean. 2010. The Extraordinary Seaman.Turner Movie Classics. The Extraordinary Seaman Retrieved 15 July 2021.
- Balio, Tino. United Artists: The Company That Changed the Film Industry. Madison, WI: University of Wisconsin Press, 1987. ISBN 9780299114404.
- Barson, Michael. 2021. John Frankenheimer: American Director. John Frankenheimer | Biography, Movies, Assessment, & Facts | Britannica Retrieved 4 July 2021.
- Baxter, John. 1970. Science Fiction in the Cinema. Edited by Peter Cowie. Paperback Library. New York. Library of Congress Catalog Card Number: 6914896.
- Bowie, Stephen. 2006. John Frankenheimer. Senses of Cinema Great Director Issue 41. Frankenheimer, John – Senses of Cinema Retrieved 1 July 2021.
- Buford, Kate. Burt Lancaster: An American Life. New York: Da Capo, 2000. ISBN 0306810190.
- Ebert, Roger. 1968. The Fixer. Reviews, December 25, 1968. The Fixer movie review & film summary (1968) | Roger Ebert Retrieved 15 August 2021.
- Evans, Alun. Brassey's Guide to War Films. Dulles, VA: Potomac Books Inc., 2000. ISBN 9781574882636.
- Baxter, Brian. 2002. "John Frankenheimer: a director of classic 1960s films, he survived depression to enjoy a late creative renaissance". The Guardian, 8 July 2002. John Frankenheimer Retrieved 5 July 2021.
- Georgaris, Bill. 2021. John Frankenheimer. They Shoot Pictures Don't They (TSPDT). TSPDT quoting from The Film Encyclopedia (1912). TSPDT - John Frankenheimer Retrieved 10 July 2021.
- Gow, Gordon. 1971. Hollywood in the Fifties. The International Film Guide Series. A. S. Barnes & Co. New York. ISBN 0302021345.
- Pratley, Gerald. 1968. The Cinema of John Frankenheimer. The International Film Guide Series. A. S. Barnes & Company, New York. ISBN 0302020004.
- Laurier, Joanne and Walsh, David. 2020. Seven Days in May (1964): When American filmmaking envisioned a military coup. The World Socialist Web Site. Seven Days in May (1964): When American filmmaking envisioned a military coup Retrieved 3 July 2021.
- Palen, Tim. 2010. The Train: John Frankenheimer's Monumental Tribute to Wartime Railway Resistance. ‘The Train’ at 60: John Frankenheimer’s Monumental Tribute to Wartime Railway Resistance • Cinephilia & Beyond Retrieved 20 July 2021.
- Simon, Alex. 1998. JOHN FRANKENHEIMER: RENAISSANCE AUTEUR. The Hollywood Interview. John Frankenheimer: A Remembrance Retrieved 15 August 2021.
- Stafford, Jeff. 2005. The Young Savages. Turner Classic Movies. The Young Savages Retrieved 1 July 2021.
- Stafford, Jeff. 2003. All Fall Down. Turner Classic Movies. All Fall Down Retrieved 1 July 2021.
- Stafford, Jeff. 2003. Birdman of Alcatraz. Turner Classic Movies. Birdman of Alcatraz Retrieved 2 July 2021.
- Safford, Jeff. 2007. Seven Days in May. Turner Classic Movies. Seven Days in May Retrieved 3 July 2021.
- Silver, Charles. 2013. John Frankenheimer's The Young Stranger. Museum of Modern Art, Department Film. MoMA | John Frankenheimer’s The Young Stranger Retrieved 1 July 2021.
- Smith, Richard Harland. 2010. Seconds. Turner Classic Movies. Seconds Retrieved 31 July 2021.
- Toole, Michael T. 2003. Sir Alan Bates (1934-2003). Turner Classic Movies. The Fixer Retrieved 15 August 2021.
- Walsh, David. 2002. Issues raised by the career of US filmmaker John Frankenheimer. World Socialist Web Site. 404: This page could not be found Retrieved 5 July 2021.
- Walsh, David. 2004. An honorable effort, but it lacks fire: The Manchurian Candidate, directed by Jonathan Demme World Socialist Web Site. An honorable effort, but it lacks fire Retrieved 3 July 2021.
- Mitchell, Lisa, Thiede, Karl, and Champlin, Charles (1995). John Frankenheimer: A Conversation with Charles Champlin (Riverwood Press), ISBN 9781880756096.
- Armstrong, Stephen B. (2008). Pictures About Extremes: The Films of John Frankenheimer (McFarland), ISBN 0786431458.
