= David Walsh (writer) =

David Walsh (born August 1, 1949 in New York City, New York) is an American film critic and the Arts Editor for the World Socialist Web Site.

== Works ==
- French Workers in Revolt: A New Stage in the Class Struggle, November–December 1995. ISBN 978-99964-1-673-6
- The Aesthetic Component of Socialism. ISBN 978-1-875639-23-6
- Hollywood Honors Elia Kazan: Filmmaker and Informer. ISBN 0-929087-98-4
- The Detroit Symphony Strike and the Defense of Culture in the US. ISBN 978-1-893638-10-5
- The Sky Between the Leaves: Film reviews, essays & interviews 1992-2012. ISBN 978-189363827-3
- Art and the Influence of Revolution. ISBN 978-1-959124-18-4
