= Evans Evans =

American actress (1932–2024)

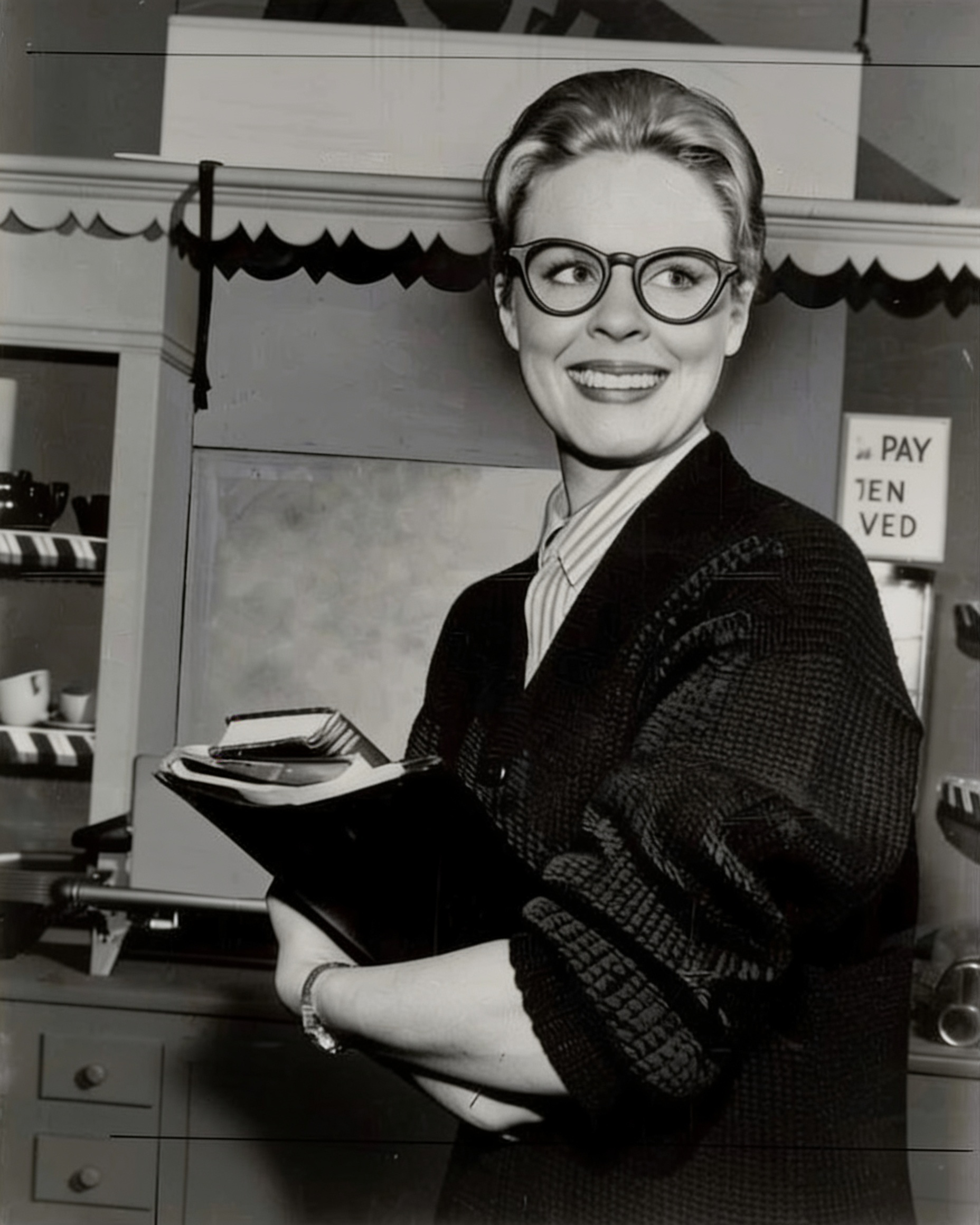
- Evans in Window on Main Street (1962)
- Born: Evans White Greenstreet; November 26, 1932; Bluefield, West Virginia, U.S.
- Died: June 16, 2024 (aged 91); Sherman Oaks, California, U.S.
- Education: St. Anne's-Belfield School; Randolph-Macon Women's College; Yale Drama School
- Occupation: Actress
- Years active: 1957–1979; 1989
- Spouse: John Frankenheimer (m. 1963; died 2002)

Evans Evans (born Evans White Greenstreet; November 26, 1932 – June 16, 2024) was an American actress who played the character Velma Davis in the 1967 film Bonnie and Clyde.

== Early life and career ==
Born Evans White Greenstreet on November 26, 1932 in Bluefield, West Virginia, she was the daughter of Clyde Elmo Greenstreet and Eleanor "Billie" Evans. Following her parents' divorce in the winter of 1937, Evans' formative years were divided between boarding school–St. Anne's-Belfield School–and summers spent in Bluefield with her maternal grandparents, Eleanor and John Clark Evans In 1948, her mother married James Rufus Richardson. Evans later attended Randolph-Macon Women's College and Yale Drama School, graduating in 1957.

Evans appeared in more than 25 feature film and television projects, including the 1961 Twilight Zone episode "A Hundred Yards Over the Rim", the 1961 Gunsmoke episode “Harpe’s Blood”, the Alfred Hitchcock Presents episode "The Big Score", The Alfred Hitchcock Hour episode "I Saw the Whole Thing" as Penny Sanford (1962), as well as Wagon Train episode “The Hollister John Garrison Story” as Melody Drake (1963), Virginian episode "Strangers at Sundown" as Phyllis Carter (1963), and, in the short-lived Richard Egan series Redigo, as Hope in "Man in a Blackout" (1963).

Evans appeared as Flirt Conroy in The Dark at the Top of the Stairs at the Music Box Theatre on Broadway in 1957, working with Teresa Wright, Pat Hingle and Eileen Heckart.

Evans was cast in an uncredited role in her husband's 1966 film Grand Prix. Four years later her maternal grandfather, John Clark Evans (1880–1978), credited as J.C. Evans, portrayed the protagonist's father in Frankenheimer's I Walk the Line.

== Personal life and death ==
Evans married director John Frankenheimer on December 13, 1963, and they remained married for nearly 40 years until his death on July 6, 2002. Evans died on June 16, 2024, at the age of 91.

== Partial filmography ==
- The Twilight Zone (1961) (Season 2 Episode 23: "A Hundred Yards Over the Rim") as Mary Lou
- Gunsmoke (1961) (Season 7 Episode 4: "Harpe's Blood") as Jenny
- Alfred Hitchcock Presents (1962) (Season 7 Episode 22: "The Big Score") as Dora
- The Alfred Hitchcock Hour (1962) (Season 1 Episode 4: "I Saw the Whole Thing") as Penny Sanford
- All Fall Down (1962) as Hedy
- The Virginian (1963) (Season 1 Episode 27: "Strangers at Sundown") as Phyllis Carter
- Grand Prix (1966) as Mrs. Randolph (uncredited)
- Bonnie and Clyde (1967) as Velma Davis
- Impossible Object (1973) as Elizabeth
- The Iceman Cometh (1973) as Cora
- Prophecy (1979) as Cellist
- Dead Bang (1989) as Mrs. Gebhardt
