= Bernard Oppenheimer =

South African businessman (1866–1921)

Sir Bernard Oppenheimer, 1st Baronet (13 February 1866 – 13 June 1921) was a South African-British diamond merchant and philanthropist.

== Business and philanthropy ==
Oppenheimer was chairman of Pniel's Ltd, the New Vaal River Diamond & Exploration Company, and Blaauwbosch Diamonds Ltd, and managing director of Lewis & Marks Ltd of Holborn. His brother, Sir Ernest Oppenheimer, was also heavily involved in the diamond industry.

In July 1917, Oppenheimer established a scheme for training disabled soldiers in diamond cutting at Brighton, England. The Bernard Oppenheimer Diamond Works (National Diamond Factories Ltd) opened on the north side of Coombe Road at the junction of Lewes Road on 17 May 1918. It was mainly paid for by Oppenheimer himself and by Lewis & Marks. In 1920 it also opened branches in Cambridge, Wrexham and Fort William. By 1921 the works, including a second building on the opposite side of Coombe Road, employed about 2,000 men who were referred to it by the Ministry of Labour. New men received six months training, during which they were paid a maintenance allowance by the government, and were then virtually guaranteed employment at a good wage. The factory had a well-equipped clinic to provide ongoing care for the employees, many of whom were amputees or otherwise severely disabled. The business did not do well and closed in 1923, but reopened later the same year. It finally went into receivership in 1924.

In 1917, he purchased the Sefton Park estate, Stoke Poges, Buckinghamshire, where he lived until his death. During that period, he and his near neighbour, Walter A. Judd, bought land which included Gray's Monument in Stoke Poges, a memorial to the English poet Thomas Gray, so as to save it for the public. In 1925, Gray's Monument and Gray's Field were handed over to the National Trust.

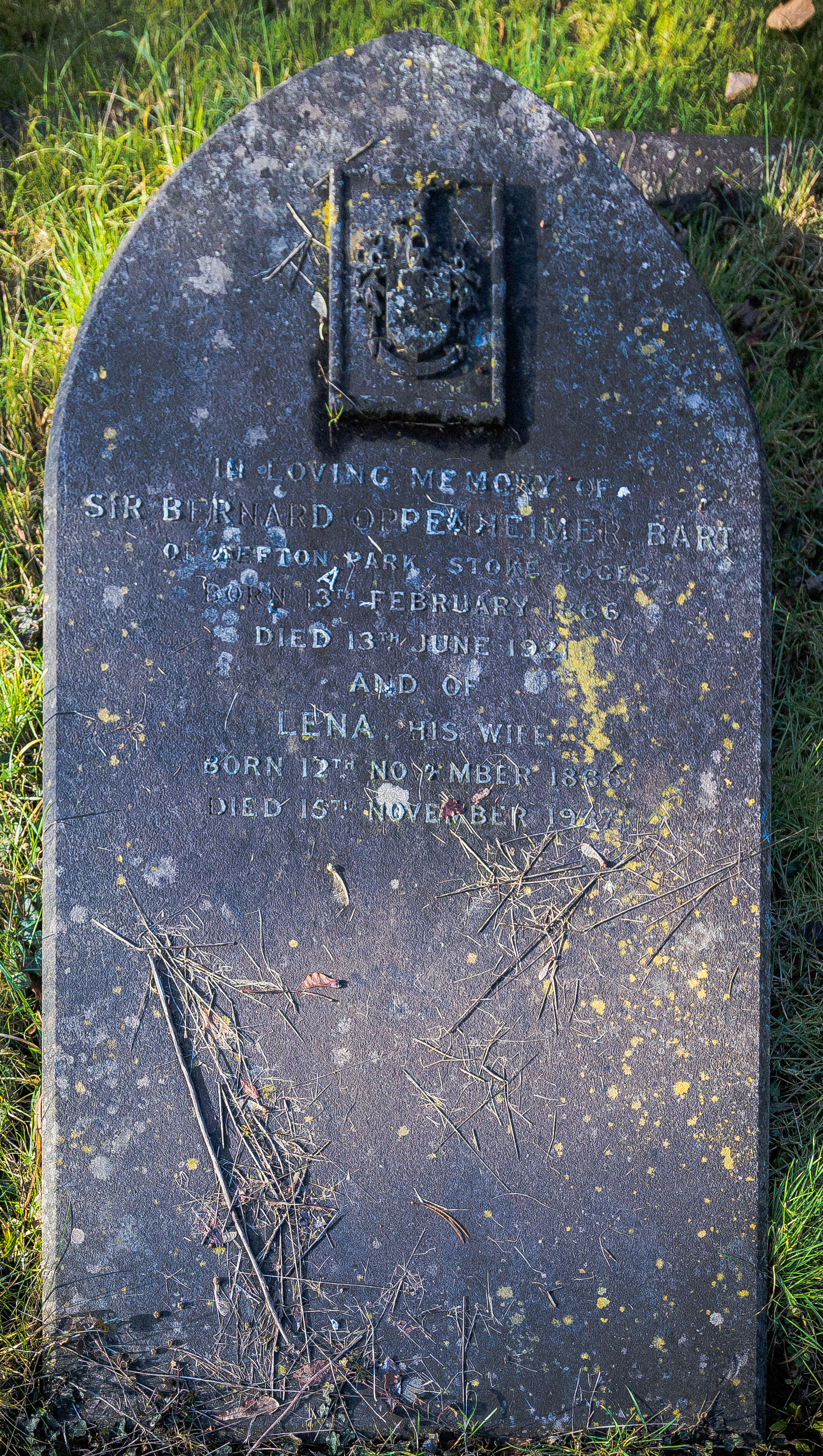
Grave of Sir Bernard Oppenheimer of Sefton Park, Stoke Poges in St Giles' churchyard, Stoke Poges

== Baronetcy ==
For his work with the disabled, Oppenheimer was created a baronet in the 1921 New Year Honours. He died suddenly six months later at the age of 55.

He married Lena Straus, on 10 September 1890 in Kimberley. At the time of his marriage his name was recorded as Bernhard Oppenheimer. He had six children with Lena Straus.

== Arms ==
Coat of arms of Bernard Oppenheimer

Crest
A demi-koodoo Proper resting the sinister hoof on a rose Gules barbed and seeded Proper.
Escutcheon
Azure two swords in saltire Proper pommelled and hilted Or between two lions passant of the last.
Motto
In Arduis Audax

== Footnotes ==
Baronetage of the United Kingdom
New creation	Baronet of Stoke Poges; 1921	Succeeded by Michael Oppenheimer
