= Oppenheimer baronets =

Extinct baronetcy in the Baronetage of the United Kingdom

The Oppenheimer baronetcy, of Stoke Poges in the County of Buckingham, was a title in the Baronetage of the United Kingdom. It was created in the 1921 New Year Honours for Bernard Oppenheimer, Chairman of the South African Diamond Corporation. The title became extinct with the death of the third baronet in 2020.

The first Baronet was the brother of Sir Ernest Oppenheimer.

== Oppenheimer baronets, of Stoke Poges (1921) ==
- Sir Bernard Oppenheimer, 1st Baronet (1866–1921)
- Sir Michael Oppenheimer, 2nd Baronet (1892–1933)
- Sir Michael Bernard Grenville Oppenheimer, 3rd Baronet (1924–2020)

== Arms ==
Coat of arms of Oppenheimer baronets
Crest A demi-koodoo Proper resting the sinister hoof on a rose Gules barbed and seeded Proper. Escutcheon Azure two swords in saltire Proper pommelled and hilted Or between two lions passant of the last. Motto In Arduis Audax
