= Moseley (disambiguation) =

Moseley is a suburb of Birmingham, England.

Moseley may also refer to:

== Places ==
- Moseley (crater), an impact crater on the Moon
- Moseley, South Australia, a locality
- Moseley, Wolverhampton, a location in England in the West Midlands
- Moseley, Worcestershire, a location in England
- Moseley, Virginia, an unincorporated community in the US

== Other uses ==
- Moseley (surname)
- Moseley Baker (1802–1848), an American lawyer, politician, and military officer
- Birmingham Moseley Rugby Club, formerly known as Moseley Rugby Football Club, based in Birmingham, England

== See also ==
- Moseley Square, Glenelg, South Australia
- Mosely (disambiguation)
- Mosley (disambiguation)
