= Mozley =

Mozley is a surname. Notable people with the surname include:

- Bert Mozley (1923–2019), English footballer
- Charles Mozley (1914–1991), English artist
- Fiona Mozley (born 1988), English novelist
- James Bowling Mozley (1813–1878), English theologian
- John Mozley (1883–1946), English Anglican priest, theologian, and academic
- J. F. Mozley (1887–1974), British Anglican priest and historian
- Loren Mozley (1905-1989), American painter and art professor
- Norman Adolphus Mozley (1865–1922), American congressman
- Thomas Mozley (1806–1893), English clergyman

== See also ==
- Moseley (surname)
- Mosely, surname
- Mosley (surname)
