= Mosley (surname) =

Mosley is an English surname and occasional given name. Notable people with the surname:

== Mosley family of Ancoats ==
- Nicholas Mosley (mayor) (c. 1527–1612), English politician
- Sir Edward Mosley, 2nd Baronet (1639–1665), English politician
- Sir Oswald Mosley, 2nd Baronet, of Ancoats (1785–1871), English politician
- Ashton Nicholas Every Mosley (1792–1875), English politician
- Sir Oswald Mosley, 4th Baronet (1848–1915), British baronet
- Tonman Mosley, 1st Baron Anslow (1850–1933), British politician
- Sir Oswald Mosley (1896–1980), leader of the British Union of Fascists
- Lady Cynthia Mosley (1898–1933), first wife of Oswald Mosley
  - Nicholas Mosley, 3rd Baron Ravensdale (1923–2017), English novelist, eldest son of Sir Oswald and Lady Cynthia Mosley
    - Ivo Mosley (born 1951), son of Nicholas Mosley, British writer
    - Daniel Mosley, 4th Baron Ravensdale (born 1982), grandson of Nicholas Mosley, British peer
- Diana Mosley (1910–2003), second wife of Oswald Mosley, formerly Diana Mitford
  - Max Mosley (1940–2021), son of Oswald and Diana Mosley, former president of the Fédération Internationale de l'Automobile
- Louis Mosley (born c. 1982), British business executive, and politician

== Other people with the surname ==
- Andrew Mosley (1885–1917), English footballer
- Barbara Tyson Mosley (born 1950), American artist
- Ben Mosley (born 1981), British artist
- Bob Mosley (born 1942), American musician
- Brandon Mosley (born 1988), American football player
- Brett Mosley, operator of BuyMyTronics.com
- Bryan Mosley (1931–1999), British actor
- C. J. Mosley (defensive lineman) (born 1983), American football player
- C. J. Mosley (linebacker) (born 1992), American football player
- Charles Mosley (coach) (1888–1968), American college sports coach
- Charles Mosley (genealogist) (1948–2013), British author and editor of genealogies
- Chris Mosley, American football coach
- Chuck Mosley (1959–2017), American singer
- Cindy Mosley (born 1975), American footballer
- Daryl Mosley (born 1964), American musician
- Dennis Mosley (born 1957), American football player
- Donald Mosley, American co-founder of Habitat for Humanity
- Earle Mosley (born 1946), American football coach
- Eddie Mosley (1947–2020), American serial killer
- Edward Mosley (MP for Preston) (died 1638), English lawyer and politician
- Edna Mosley (1899–1954), English architect
- Eleanor Mosley (1700–?), English businesswoman
- Eli Mosley, pseudonym of Elliot Kline (born 1991), American Neo-nazi and former head of Identity Evropa
- Ellen Mosley, maiden name of Ellen Mosley-Thompson, American climatologist
- Emmett Mosley, American football player
- Geoff Mosley (born 1931), Australian conservationist
- Glenn Mosley (basketball) (born 1955), American basketball player
- Henry Mosley (cricketer) (1852–1953), English cricketer
- Henry Mosley (bishop) (1868–1948), English bishop
- Hinson Mosley (born 1932), American politician
- Ian Mosley (born 1953), English drummer in the band Marillion
- Isiaih Mosley (born 2000), American basketball player
- J. Brooke Mosley (1915–1988), American bishop
- Jack Mosley, American boxing coach
- Jamahl Mosley (born 1978), American basketball player and coach
- James Mosley (1935–2025), English historian specialized in the history of printing and letter design
- Jamey Mosley (born 1995), American football player
- Jamie Mosley (born 1969), American racecar driver
- Jeremy Mosley, American politician
- John Mosley (1921–2015), American football player and soldier
- John W. Mosley (1907–1969), American photographer
- Joshua Mosley (born 1974), American artist
- Judy Mosley, maiden name of Judy Mosley-McAfee (1968–2013), American basketball player
- Karla Mosley (born 1981), American actress
- Kendrick Mosley (born 1981), American football player
- Lacey Mosley, maiden name of Lacey Sturm (born 1981), American vocalist for the band Flyleaf
- Layna Mosley, American political scientist
- Leonard Mosley (1913–1992) British journalist, historian, biographer and novelist
- Maxine Mosley, American politician
- Michael Mosley (actor) (born 1978), American actor
- Michael Mosley (1957–2024), British BBC television presenter, producer, and journalist
- Mike Mosley (1946–1984), American racecar driver
- Mike Mosley (American football) (born 1958), American football player
- Miles Mosley (born 1980), American musician
- Paul Mosley, American politician
- Ramaa Mosley (born 1978), American filmmaker
- Richard Mosley (born 1949), Canadian judge
- Robert Mosley (1927–2002), American opera singer
- Robert Mosley (pop musician), American vocalist
- Rocky Mosley Jr (born 1956), American boxer
- Roger E. Mosley (1938–2022), American actor
- Russ Mosley (1918–1997), American football player
- Sean Mosley (born 1989), American basketball player
- Seth Mosley (born 1987), American musician
- Shane Mosley (born 1971), American boxing champion
- Snub Mosley (1905–1981), American jazz musician
- Stefan Mosley (born 1952), American author
- Stephen Mosley (born 1972), Member of Parliament for the City of Chester, England.
- Tereneh Mosley, American fashion designer
- Thaddeus Mosley (1926–2026), American sculptor
- Timothy Mosley (born 1972), known as Timbaland, American hip hop producer and rapper
- Tonya Mosley, American broadcast journalist
- Tracey Mosley (born 1973), Australian softball player
- Tre Mosley (born 2001), American football player
- Trent Mosley (born 2006), American football player
- Walter Mosley (born 1952), American crime fiction writer
- Walter Mosley (US lawyer), American lawyer
- Walter Harold Mosley (1916–1942), American fighter pilot
- Walter T. Mosley (born 1967), American politician
- Wayne Mosley, founder of the pizza chain Rocky Rococo
- Wendell Mosley (1932–1989), American football player and coach
- William Mosley (born 1989), American basketball player
- Zack Mosley (1906–1993), American comic strip artist

== Given name ==
- Mosley Mayne (1889–1995), British military officer

== See also ==
- Moseley (surname)
  - Henry Moseley (1887–1915), Noted British physicist killed at Gallipoli
- Mozley
- Mosley baronets
