= Mosley =

Mosley may refer to:

- Mosley (film), 2019 New Zealand animated film
- Mosley (1998 serial), 1998 British television serial
- Mosley (surname), includes a list of people with the surname
- Mosley Mayne (1889–1955), British military officer
- Mosley Street, street in Manchester, England

== See also ==
- Moseley (disambiguation)
