= Curtiss-Wright Technical Institute =

Coordinates: 34.1630°N 118.2867°W

- Glendale, California; United States

Information
- Type: Vocational
- Established: 1929
- School district: Grand Central Air Terminal
- Head of school: Major C. C. Moseley
- Enrollment: 1500
- Affiliation: Curtiss-Wright companies

The Curtiss-Wright Technical Institute was an early professional trade school operated by the Curtiss-Wright corporation for aircraft maintenance training. Director Major C. C. Moseley was one of only three school directors selected across America to set the standards for the pre-World War II civilian pilot training program.

The institute was first set up in the terminal building of Grand Central Air Terminal in Glendale, California, expanding to neighboring hangars and buildings around the airport. Both TWA and American Airlines flew transcontinental service from the airport. During World War II, over 7500 mechanics were trained at the facility.

In 1950 the institute became part of the Grand Central Aircraft Company and Curtiss-Wright Technical Institute was renamed as the Cal-Aero Technical Institute. The U.S. Air Force used the institute to train mechanics on contract until 1952. Enrollment dropped sharply after the cancellation of the contract and the facility closed in 1954.

== Coursework ==
At its peak, CWTI had eight fields of study.

- Aeronautical Engineering
- Post Graduate Aeronautical Engineering
- Master Aviation Mechanic
- Specialized Engine
- Specialized Airplane
- Specialized Sheet Metal
- Aeronautical Drafting
- Aircraft Blueprint Reading

== History ==
The Institute taught practical aircraft design with students producing actual aircraft that went into production.

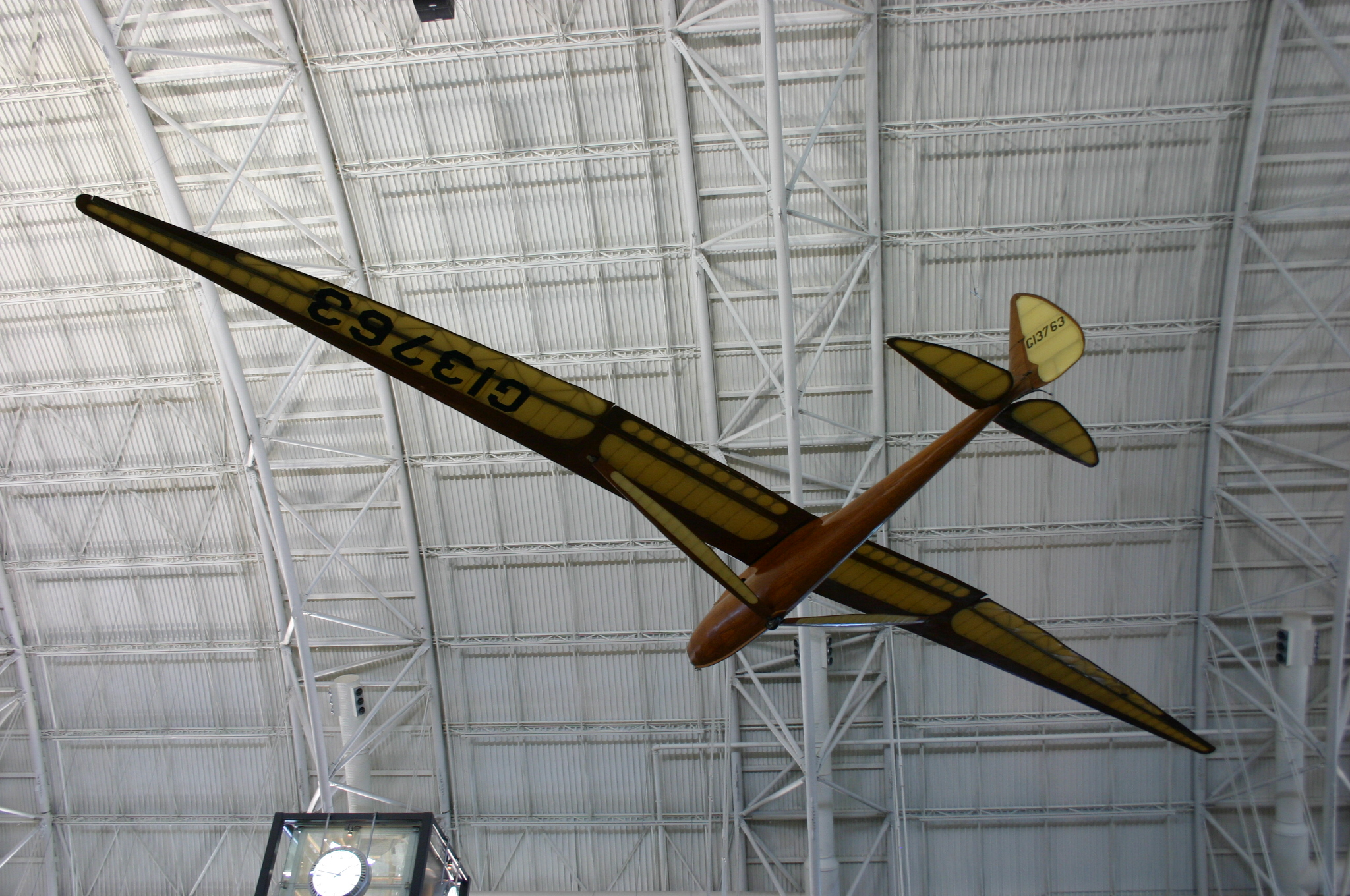
Bowlus 1-S-2100

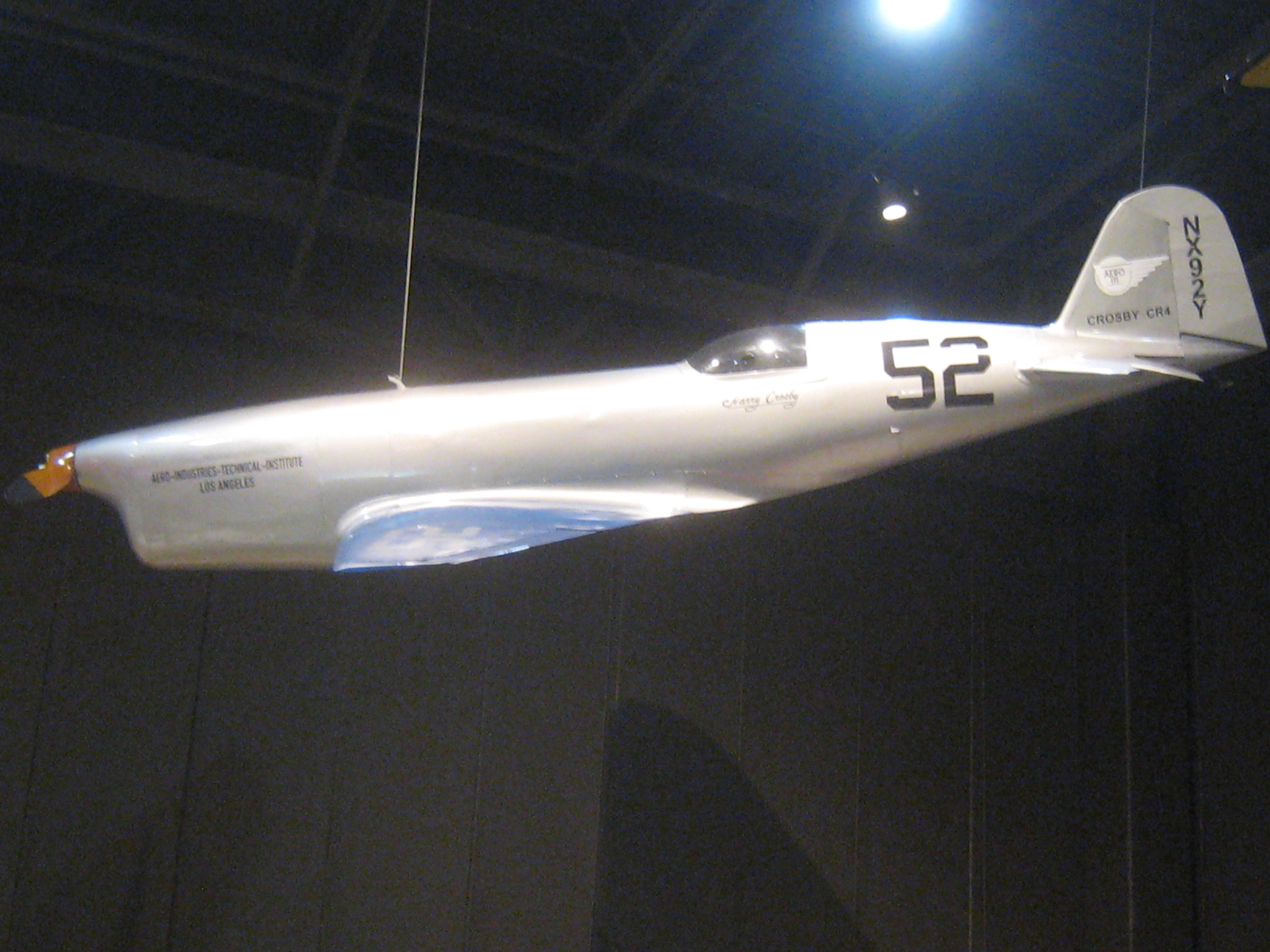
Crosby CR-4

Martin Schempp taught courses in aircraft design at the CWTI. Together with students, they developed the 1932 Super Sailplane which served as the prototype for the Bowlus 1-S-2100 Senior Albatross "Falcon" glider. This aircraft is on display in the Smithsonian's National Air and Space Museum. Richard C. du Pont was an early student who worked on the program and used the expertise gained to found the Bowlus-DuPont Sailplane Company in 1934.

In 1935, students built the Al Novotney designed Bunting I racer which competed in the National Air Races.

The Curtiss Coupe was designed by students and put in limited production by Curtiss-Wright in Robertson, Missouri.

Students also helped develop and construct the Burrows R-6, Rider R-6, Crosby C6R3, and Crosby CR-4 racing aircraft.

== See also ==
- Curtiss-Wright
- Grand Central Air Terminal
