= C. J. Mosley =

C. J. Mosley may refer to:

- C. J. Mosley (defensive lineman) (born 1983), American football defensive lineman
- C. J. Mosley (linebacker) (born 1992), American football linebacker

== See also ==
- Mosley (surname)
