= Crosby CR-4 =

CR-4
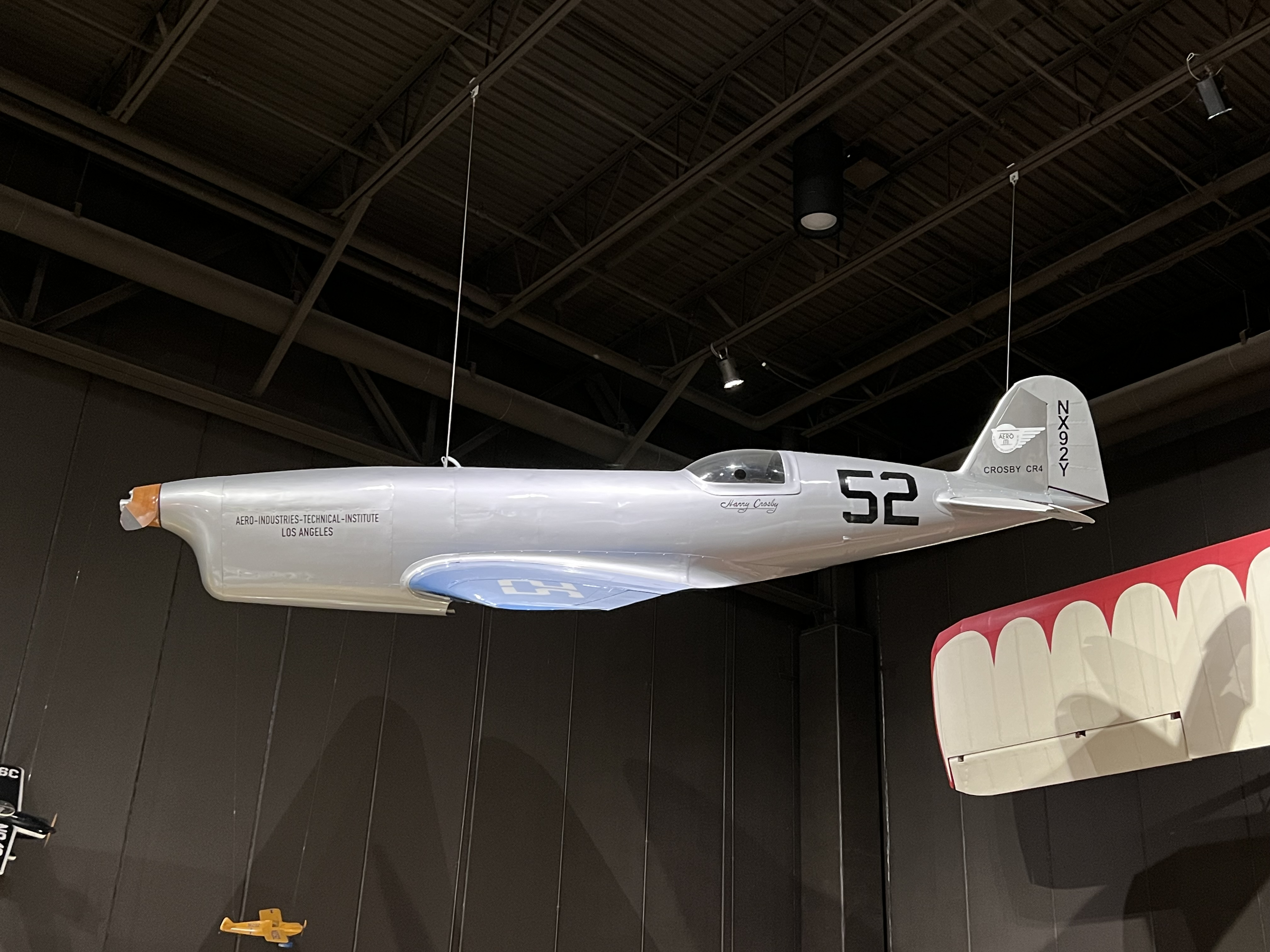
- CR-4 displayed at the EAA Airventure Museum

General information
- Type: Racing aircraft
- National origin: United States
- Designer: Harry Crosby
- Number built: 1

History
- First flight: April 1938
- Developed from: Crosby CR-3

The Crosby CR-4 is a racing aircraft developed in the late 1930s

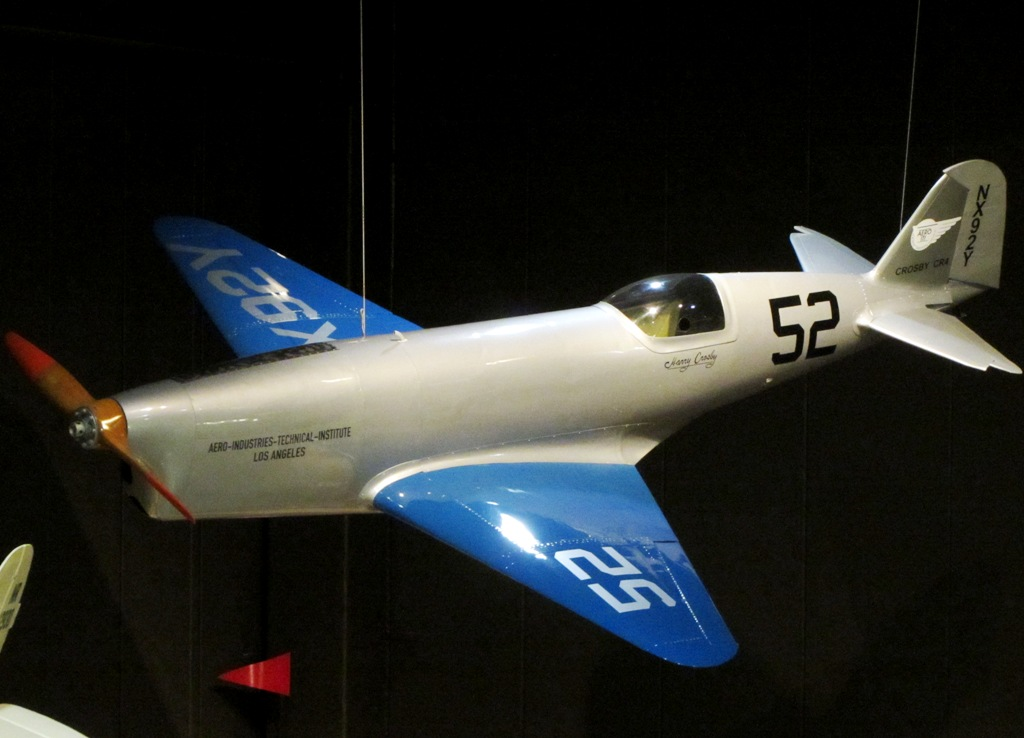
CR-4

== Development ==
The Crosby CR-4 is the follow-on of the Menasco C6S-4 powered Crosby CR-3 (a.k.a. C6R-3) designed to be powered by a twelve-cylinder Ranger V-770 engine The aircraft was designed while Crosby was recovering with a broken back and fractured skull from the 1936 crash of his all metal CR-3. Despite a prior failure causing a crash, money shortages prompted Crosby to reuse the Menasco C6S-4 engine from his former racer. Funding for construction came from fellow racer Kieth Rider. Students from the Curtiss-Wright Technical Institute in Glendale, California assembled the aircraft.

== Design ==
The CR-4 is a low-wing monoplane with conventional landing gear. The construction is all-metal stressed skin. The triangular wings featured a straight leading edge with a long chord tapering to a point at the wingtips. The left cowling held a combination oil tank and surface cooler. The seat and canopy adjusted up six inched in travel for take off and landing visibility. The landing gear used compressed air from a Lux air bottle rather than mechanical or hydraulic mechanism. Copper filings found later in the line, combined with wind resistance prevented one leg from locking.

== Operational history ==
The first flight was performed in April 1938 at Mines Field with severe aileron flutter and a wheel collapse on landing.

- 1938 Greve races. Crosby landed while on fire in the 14th lap from an engine manifold that fell off in flight.
- 1938 Thompson Trophy races. The CR-4 was repaired just in time for the race but landed with fuel leakage problems.
- 1939 Greve races. Crosby's landing gear failed to retract from a leaking compressed air tank. Crosby landed after 14 laps with a third-place finish.
- 1939 Thompson Trophy. Crosby finished fourth with engine troubles.

In late 1939, the CR-4 was filmed for use in the movie Tail Spin. In 1945, Crosby died while bailing out of a XP-79B. The CR-4 was sold by his wife to be restored by its new owner. The aircraft was placed in storage in a school bus until purchased by Morton Lester. Lester donated the airframe to the EAA Airventure museum in Oshkosh, Wisconsin, where it was restored and placed on display.

== Variants ==
- Crosby CIP-5 - With the onset of WWII, Crosby developed an all wood interceptor around the CR-4 design and its intended Twelve cylinder Ranger engine. Construction material was wood rather than the advanced all-metal design of the prior racers.

== Specifications (CR-4) ==
Data from Sport Aviation

General characteristics

- Crew: 1
- Length: 21 ft 6 in (6.55 m)
- Wingspan: 16 ft (4.9 m)
- Empty weight: 1,540 lb (699 kg)
- Powerplant: 1 × Menasco C6S-4 Inline, 260 hp (190 kW)
- Propellers: 2-bladed, 6 ft (1.8 m) diameter

Performance

- Maximum speed: 335 kn (386 mph, 621 km/h)
