= Grand Central Airport (California) =

- Grand Central Air Terminal
- U.S. National Register of Historic Places
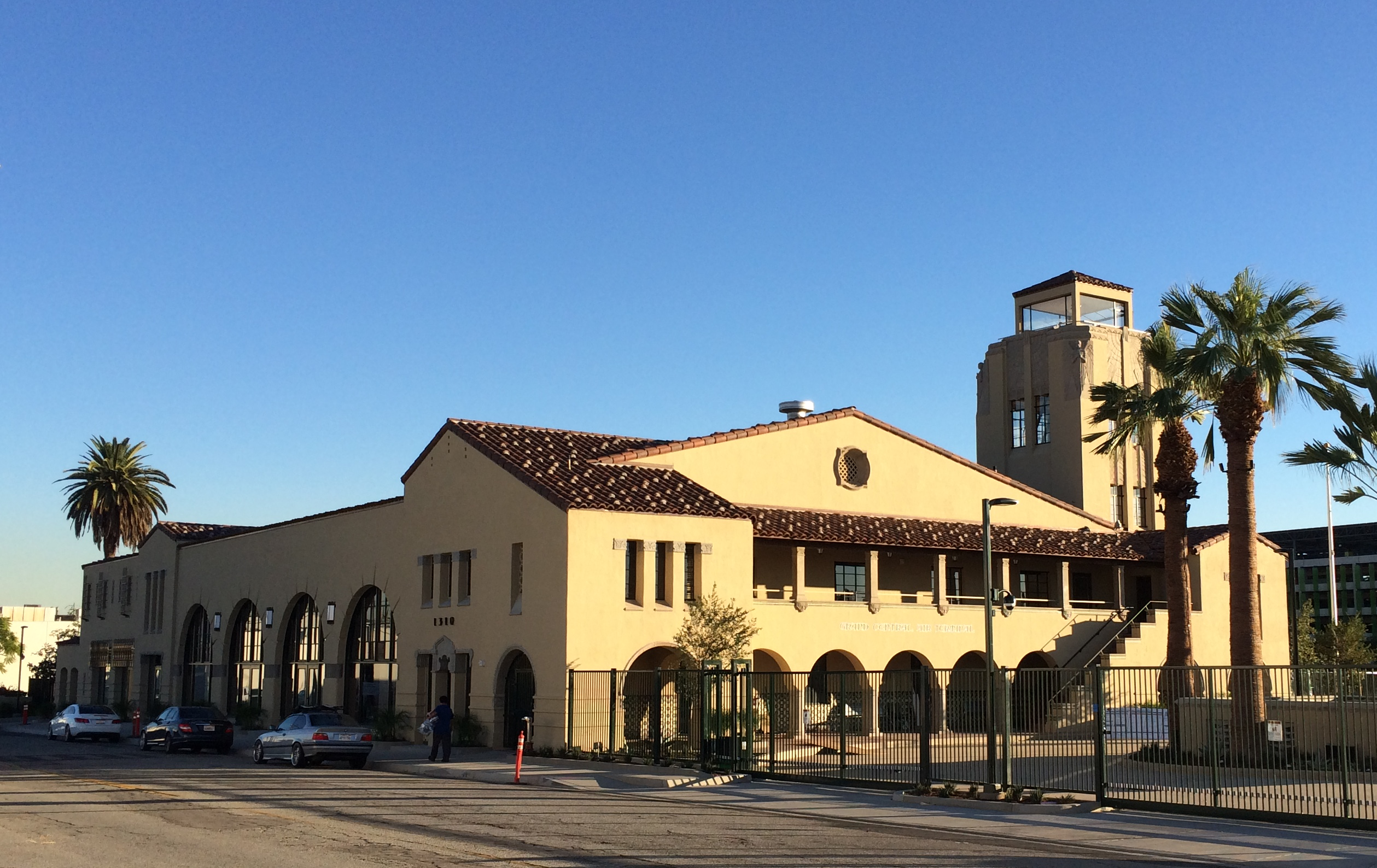
- Interactive map highlighting the building's location
- Location: 1310 Air Way, Glendale, California
- Coordinates: 34.1630°N 118.2867°W
- Built: 1929
- Architectural style: Art Deco, Spanish Colonial Revival
- NRHP reference No.: 100000780
- Added to NRHP: March 27, 2017

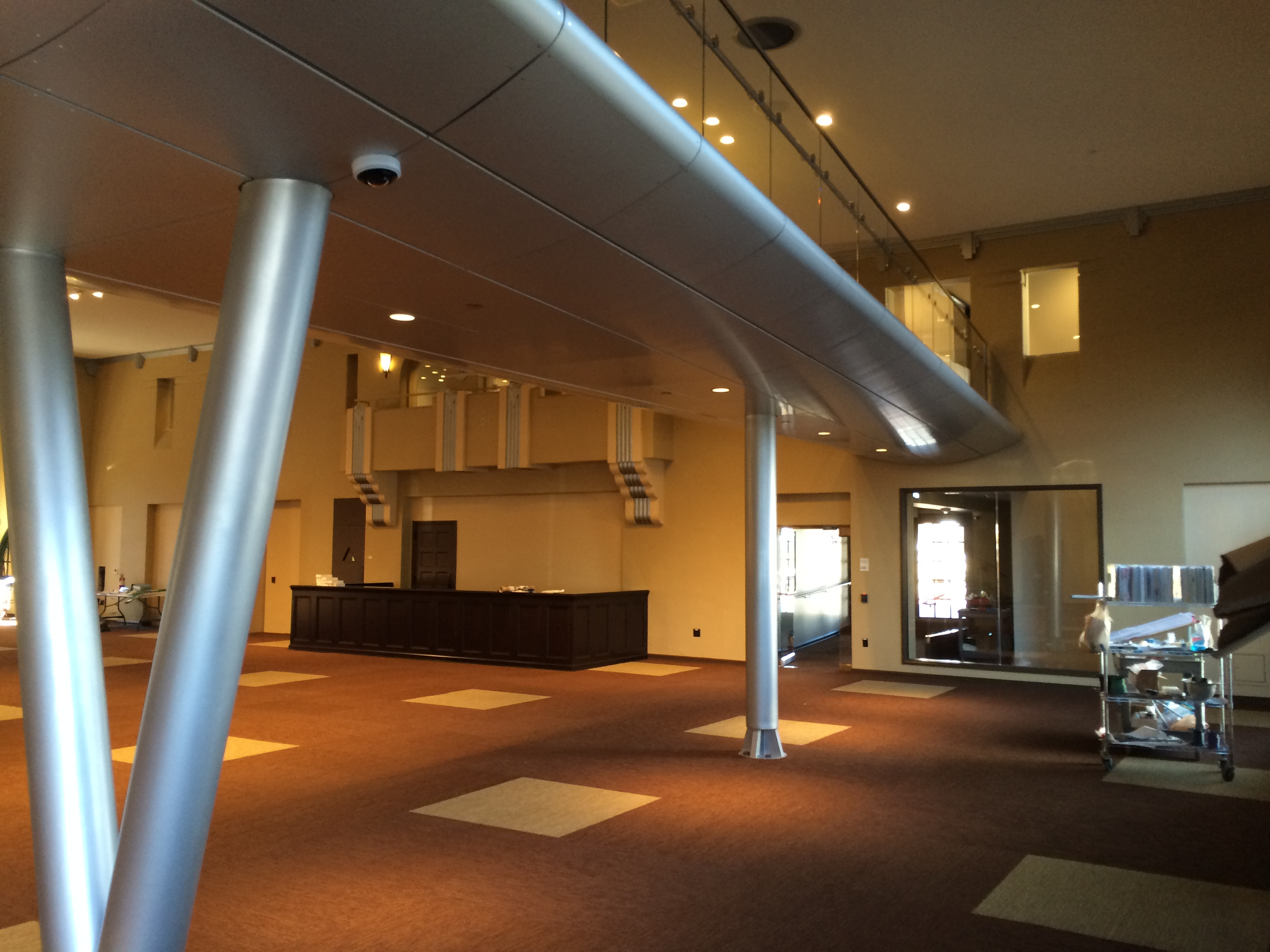
Interior of Grand Central Air Terminal building in 2015

Grand Central Airport is a former airport in Glendale, California. Also known as Grand Central Air Terminal (GCAT), the airport was an important facility for the growing Los Angeles suburb in the 1920s and a key element in the development of United States aviation. The terminal, located at 1310 Air Way, was built in 1928 and still exists, owned since 1997 by the Walt Disney Company as a part of its Grand Central Creative Campus (GC3). Three hangars also remain standing. The location of the single concrete 3,800-foot (1,200 m) runway has been preserved, but is now a public street as the runway was dug up and converted into Grand Central Avenue.

The terminal building was added to the National Register of Historic Places on March 27, 2017.

== Beginnings ==
The concept for the airport probably began with Leslie Coombs Brand (1859–1925), a major figure in the settlement and economic growth of the Glendale area. He had purchased land on the lower slopes of Mount Verdugo overlooking the city, and built an imposing residence that became known as Brand Castle (which today houses the Brand Library) in 1904. Just across the mostly dry Los Angeles River he could see the Griffith Park Aerodrome's grass field, built in 1912. Just three years later he decided to build his own grass airstrip below his mansion. He built his first hangar in 1916, put together a fleet of planes, and held fly-in parties. The only requirement was that guests had to arrive in their own planes and bring passengers.

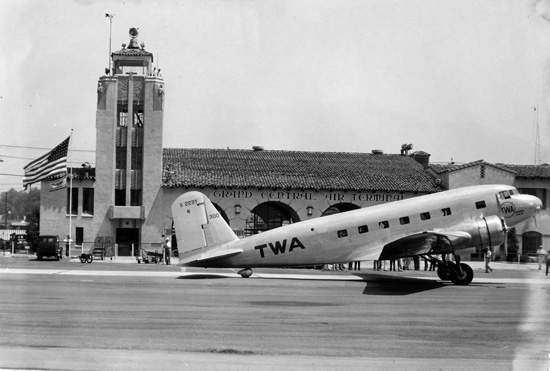
The Douglas DC-1 in front of the terminal

External image
- Aerial view of Grand Central Airport, looking southeast

From this modest beginning, plans were soon hatched by local entrepreneurs to establish an airport with commercial possibilities a little further down below his field. In 1923 the 112-acre (0.45 km^{2}) Glendale Municipal Airport opened with a 100 ft (30 m)-wide paved runway 3,800 ft (1,200 m) long, and came to be renamed "Grand Central Air Terminal" when it was purchased by other venture capitalists, who expanded it to 175 acres (0.71 km^{2}). On February 22, 1929, a terminal with a control tower had been built, and was opened to much fanfare. Designed by Henry L. Gogerty, the intention was to construct an air terminal along the lines of a classic railroad terminal. It combined a style consisting of Spanish Colonial Revival with Zig-zag Moderne influences (Art Deco). GCAT became a major airport of entry to Los Angeles and provided the first paved runway west of the Rocky Mountains.

Within a year, the entire enterprise was sold to the Curtiss-Wright Flying Service, managed by C. C. Moseley, a co-founder of the future Western Airlines. It became the city's largest employer. It was also at Grand Central that Moseley established the first of his private flying schools, Curtiss-Wright Technical Institute (later renamed Cal-Aero Academy).

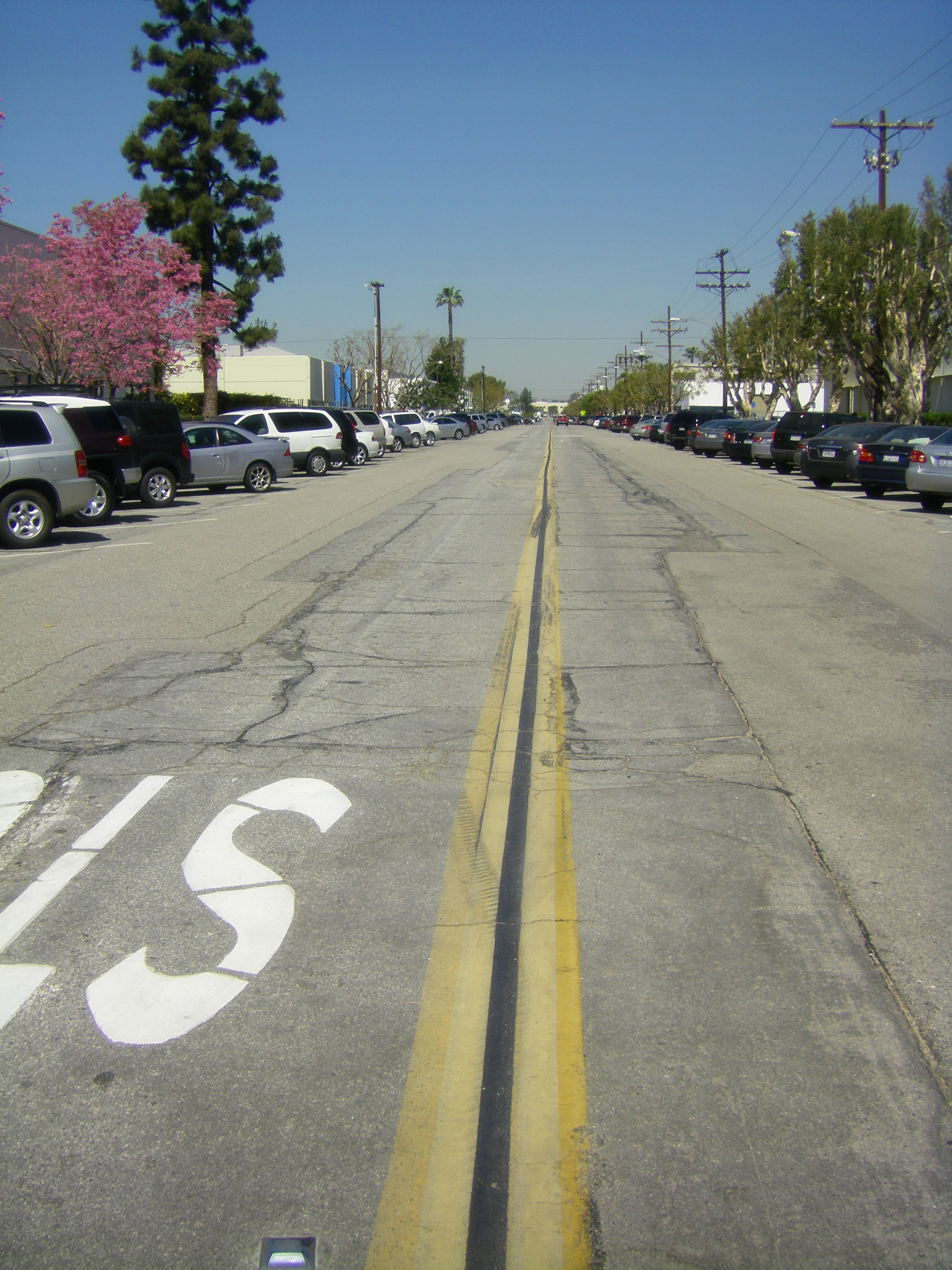
The former runway, now Grand Central Avenue

== Pioneering people at GCAT ==
Many famous aviation pioneers made their home and their mark at GCAT, as pilots, designers, mechanics, teachers, salesmen, and airplane/power-plant builders, often serving in some combination, including:

- Charles Lindbergh, who piloted the nation's first regularly scheduled coast to coast flight from Grand Central's runway as organizer of Transcontinental Air Transport which, after merging with Western Air Express, came to be Transcontinental and Western Air, later renamed Trans-World Airlines.
- Amelia Earhart used the airport and bought her first plane there.
- Laura Ingalls became the first woman to fly solo across the country when she landed at Glendale in 1930.
- Albert Forsythe and Charles Anderson were the first African American pilots who made the transcontinental flight, completed at Glendale in 1933. Their achievement paved the way for the black Tuskegee Airmen who fought in World War II.
- Thomas Benton Slate built an all-metal dirigible and hangar in 1925. It was 212 ft (65 m) long, and supposedly fireproof. He named it "City of Glendale". It left the ground briefly in 1929, popped some rivets, and crashed.
- Howard Hughes built his record-setting H-1 Racer in a small building at 911 Air Way in 1935, thus beginning the Hughes Aircraft Company. The building burned to the ground in the late 1990s.
- Jack Northrop started his Avion Aviation company on the field in 1927, where he built multi-cellular metal structures.
- William Boeing bought the business from Northrop, and moved it to Burbank's United Airport (now Hollywood Burbank Airport).
- C. C. Moseley established overhaul facilities there, and operated a flight academy whose pilot and mechanic graduates traveled to Europe as the all-volunteer Eagle Squadron who flew against Hitler at the Battle of Britain before America entered the war.
- Actor Robert Cummings was an active pilot and flight instructor who used this airport.

Airlines originating at GCA included TWA, Varney, Western, and Pickwick Airlines.

== Movies and movie stars ==
The airport was the setting of several films, including Howard Hughes' Hell's Angels (1930), Shirley Temple's Bright Eyes (1934), Lady Killer (1933) starring James Cagney, Sky Giant (1938) with Joan Fontaine, Hats Off (1936) with John Payne, the musical Hollywood Hotel (1937) with Dick Powell, and the adventure film Secret Service of the Air (1939) starring Ronald Reagan. Episodes of the 1941 movie serial Sky Raiders show the terminal and other GCAT structures. The terminal was a favorite shooting location.

The airport was also known for stunt flying and supplying planes for use in the movie industry by people like Paul Mantz. Just about every airplane design flying during the 1920s, 1930s and 1940s could be seen at GCAT for use in movies, or there to be serviced.

== Wartime ==
When Pearl Harbor was attacked on December 7, 1941, Grand Central Airport (like all other west coast airports) was immediately closed to private aviation. (The remaining airlines had already moved to Burbank.) The government moved in, heavily camouflaged the place, and converted it into an important defense base for Los Angeles. In 1942, the runway, which originally ended at Sonora Avenue, was extended North to Western Avenue, giving it a 5,000' length to accommodate large airplanes and future jet aircraft.

Training of United States Army Air Forces flying cadets began under contract to Grand Central Flying School, Cal-Aero Training Corporation, and Polaris Flight Academy. The facility was assigned to West Coast Training Center (later Western Flying Training Command) as a primary (level 1) pilot training airfield, which also instructed Royal Air Force flying cadets. Some who would go on to become members of the Eagle Squadrons. (71 Squadron: Bob Sprague, J.J. Lynch, 121 Squadron: Kenneth Holder, Don McLeod, Jim Peck, Forrest Cox, John Lynch. 133 Squadron: James Coxetter, Hugh Brown). The Fairchild PT-19 was the primary flight trainer, along with Vultee BT-13s. The Grand Central Flying School (GCFS) started out at the airfield and evolved into the Cal-Aero Flight Academy (CAFA). Cal-Aero had schools at Ontario, Mira Loma at Oxnard, and Polaris at War Eagle Field. Glendale Junior College staffed flight ground school at Grand Central Air Field.

A P-38 training base was built on the west side near the river which prepared the 319th Fighter Wing for action in Europe. Hundreds of P-51s, C-47s, B-25s and others transitioned Grand Central Airport in Glendale for refurbishment and reconditioning. Larger aircraft, like the B-29, were sent to the Grand Central Service Center in Tucson, Arizona.

On April 14, 1944, a fire destroyed three buildings, burned seven aircraft, and injured five workmen, one of them seriously.

== Postwar ==
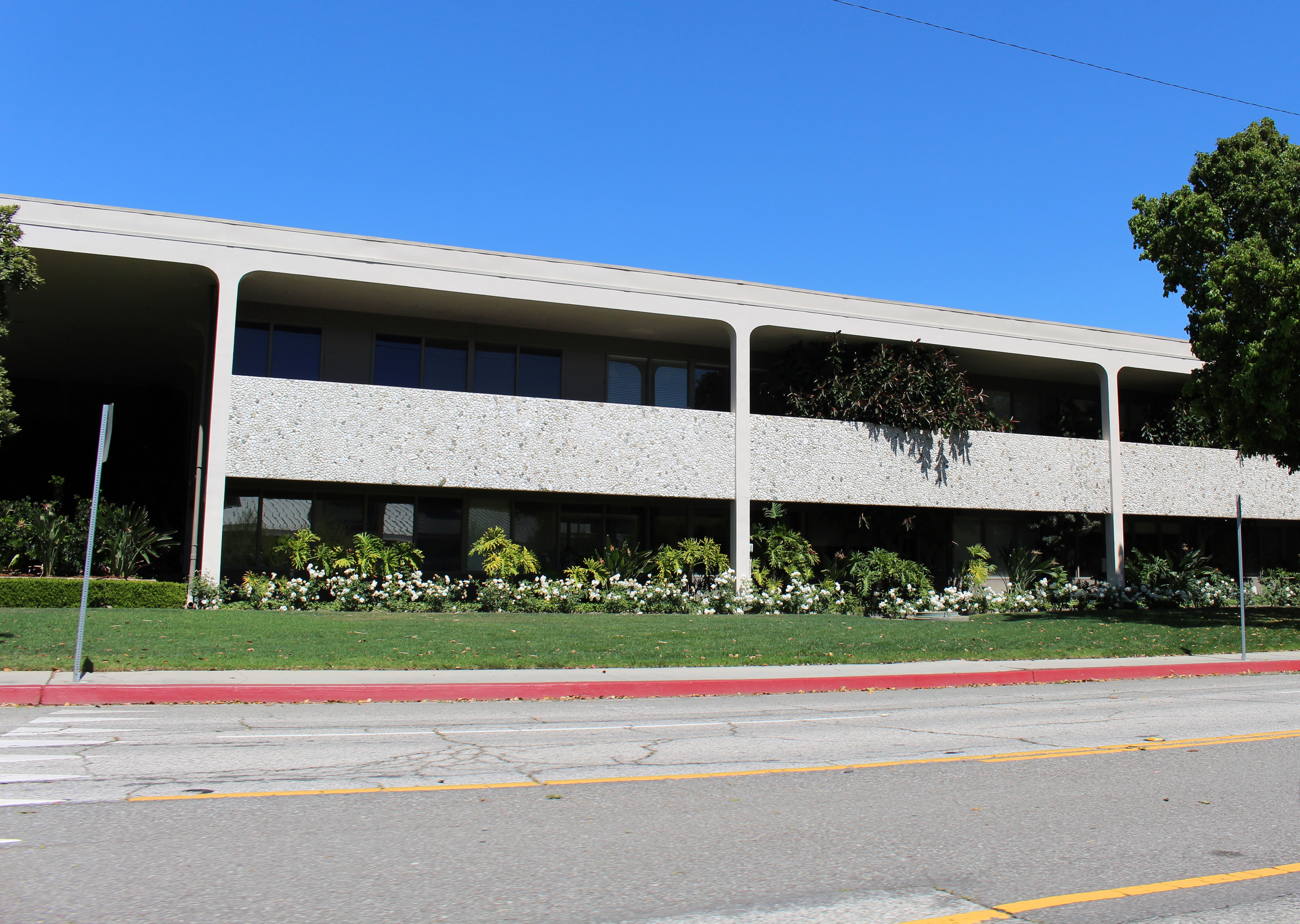
Walt Disney Imagineering headquarters at 1401 Flower Street, photographed in 2021

After the war, the airport was returned to private use and renamed Grand Central Airport. By 1947, the runway had been cut back to 3,800 feet (1,200 m), southeast of Sonora Ave, due to pressure from local government. The airport struggled financially. One of its few successes was hosting a SCCA National Sports Car Championship race on November 13, 1955, that attracted 6,000 spectators. In 1959, the owners of the airport announced it was closing. Most of the land would be used to build a business park.

Two aviation related organizations would remain on the property. A portion of former airport was used as a heliport for the Los Angeles Police Department's fleet of Bell 47 and Bell 206 helicopters, until the LAPD Hooper Heliport opened in downtown Los Angeles in 1983.

Major Corliss C. Moseley established the Grand Central Rocket Company in the vicinity of Grand Central Air Terminal in 1955. It was there that the third stages of early Vanguard rockets, including the first two to reach orbit, were built.

In 1961, Walt Disney purchased a large portion of the land to establish a creative workshop for employees working on the construction of Disney theme parks and attractions worldwide. Initially called WED Enterprises, the team came to be known as Walt Disney Imagineering.

== Grand Central Creative Campus ==
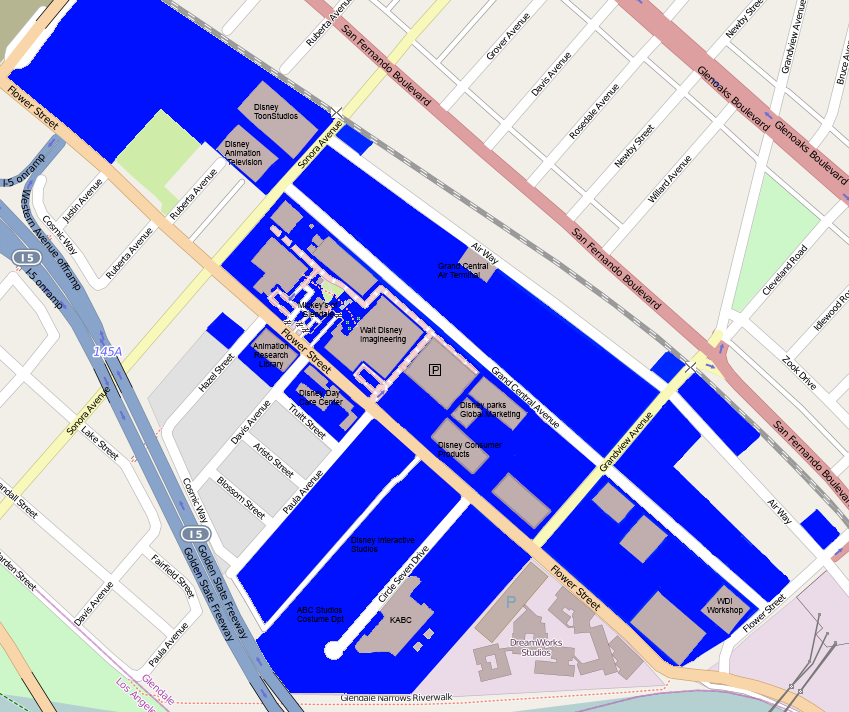
Grand Central Creative Campus map

In September 1999, Disney and the city of Glendale announced plans to redevelop a significant portion of the Grand Central Business Park, adjacent to the Imagineering buildings, into Disney's Grand Central Creative Campus (GC3). The $2 billion project aimed to replace the area's plain concrete structures with architecturally distinctive office buildings and enhanced landscaping, which the city hoped would spur broader redevelopment.

The initial plan, unveiled in March 2000, proposed expanding Disney’s footprint to 3.6 million square feet (330,000 m^{2}), featuring a studio production facility with sound stages and multiple four- to six-story office buildings, designed to accommodate up to 10,000 employees.

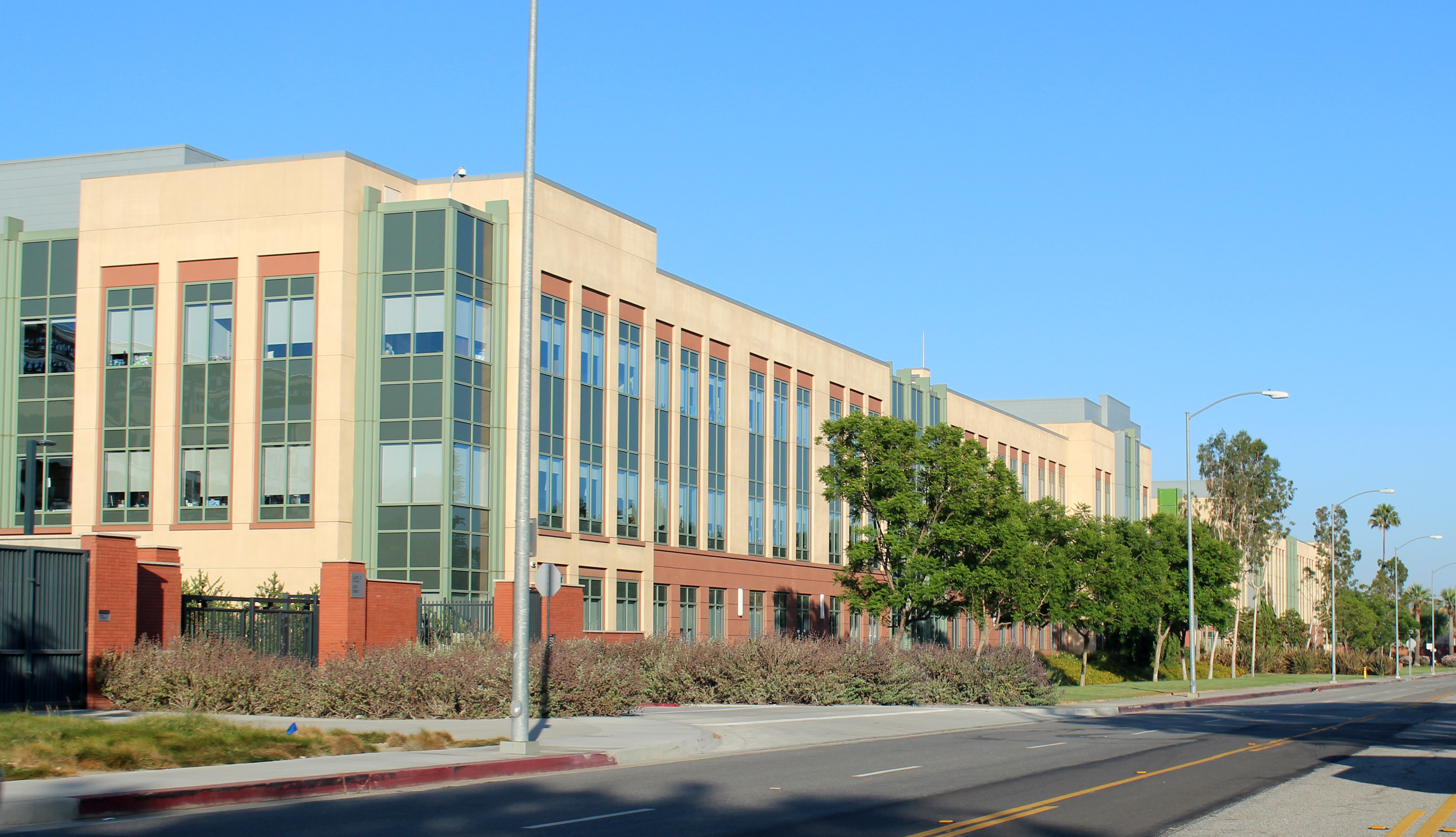
1101 and 1201 Flower Street office buildings on the Grand Central Creative Campus

The final approved plan in 2004, however, eliminated the studio production facilities in favor of two 125,000-square-foot (11,600 m^{2}) Art Deco-style office buildings at 1101 and 1201 Flower Street. The design paid homage to the original Grand Central Air Terminal and Disney’s newly constructed KABC-TV studio, which had recently relocated from The Prospect Studios.

Construction of the campus' second phase began in September 2010, adding a third 338,000-square-foot (31,400 m^{2}) six-story office building and a parking structure, providing space for an additional 1,200 employees.

Disney undertook an extensive restoration of the historic Grand Central Air Terminal building between 2012 and 2014. By the time Disney acquired the structure in 1997, it had fallen into significant disrepair. The restoration project preserved or recreated many of the building’s character-defining elements, returning the structure to its former grandeur. The terminal now functions as both an event space and an office facility for Disney and features a small visitor center that presents photographs and original artifacts from the site's days as an airport. The restoration project earned a Los Angeles Conservancy Preservation Award in 2017.

In November 2018, the Disney Store headquarters relocated from the Royal Laundry Complex in Pasadena to GC3.

Disney units on the campus are:

- Circle 7 Animation (2004–2006)
- Disney Children's Center, a daycare
- Disney Consumer Products
- Disney Research
- Disney Television Animation (2011–present)
- Disney Store headquarters
- Disneytoon Studios (1990–2018)
- KABC-TV
- Marvel Animation, 623 Circle Seven Drive
- Mickey's of Glendale, a company store
- Walt Disney Animation Studios (1985–1995)
- Walt Disney Imagineering (1961–present)

== See also ==
- Glendale Register of Historic Resources and Historic Districts
- Portal of the Folded Wings Shrine to Aviation
- California World War II Army Airfields
- Ed Dyess
