= Moseley (surname) =

Moseley is a surname. Notable people with the surname include:

- Bill Moseley (born 1951), American actor
- C. C. Moseley (1894–1974), American aviator, trainer and businessman
- Doug Moseley (1928–2017), United Methodist clergyman and member of the Kentucky State Senate
- Dustin Moseley (born 1981), Major League Baseball pitcher
- Edwin Lincoln Moseley (1865–1948), American naturalist
- Emmanuel Moseley (born 1996), American football player
- Ezra Moseley (1958–2021), West Indian cricketer
- Frank Moseley (1911–1979), American college sports coach and administrator
- George Van Horn Moseley (1874–1960), United States Army general and Nazi sympathizer
- Henry Moseley (1887–1915), English physicist
- Henry J. Moseley (c. 1819 – 1894) builder and hotelier in Glenelg, South Australia
- Henry Nottidge Moseley (1844–1891), British naturalist
- Humphrey Moseley (died 1661), London bookseller and publisher
- Increase Moseley (1712–1795), American government official
- James Moseley (politician) (c. 1847 – 1937), politician in South Australia
- James W. Moseley (1931–2012), American ufologist
- Jonny Moseley (born 1975), Puerto Rican skier and 1998 Olympic gold medalist
- John Moseley, American lieutenant colonel
- John O. Moseley (1893–1955), American academic and university president
- Keith Moseley (born 1965), American musician
- Macauley Moseley (born 1997), British Law Scholar
- Marisa Moseley (born 1982), American basketball coach
- Mark Moseley (born 1948), retired National Football League placekicker
- Michael E. Moseley, American anthropologist
- Moses J. Moseley (1990-2022), American actor
- Semie Moseley (1935–1992), American guitar designer and founder of the Mosrite guitar manufacturing corporation
- Sydney Moseley (1888–1961), British journalist and early radio and television broadcasting pioneer
- T. Michael Moseley (born 1949), former Chief of Staff of the United States Air Force
- Vickie M. Moseley (born 1956), American politician
- William Moseley (actor) (born 1987), English actor
- William Dunn Moseley (1795–1863), American politician from North Carolina
- William P. Moseley (1819-1890) businessman and Virginia senator
- Winston Moseley, convicted in the 1964 murder of Kitty Genovese

== See also ==
- Mosely, surname
- Mosley (surname)
