= Mosely =

Mosely is a family name. Notable people with the name include:

- Edward Mosely, the collector of the Mosely Collection of stamps which is now on exhibition in the British Library Philatelic Collections
- Martin Ephraim Mosely (1877-1948), English entomologist
- Merv Mosely, American football player
- Peter Mosely, an American musician
- Robert Mosely, American singer and songwriter known for writing "Sha-La-La" and "Midnight Flyer"
- Semie Mosely, American guitar maker and founder of Mosrite Guitars
- Detective Mosely, a fictional character from the Gabriel Knight game series

== See also ==
- Moseley (surname)
- Mosley (surname)
- Mozley, surname
