= Fokker S.IX =

S.IX
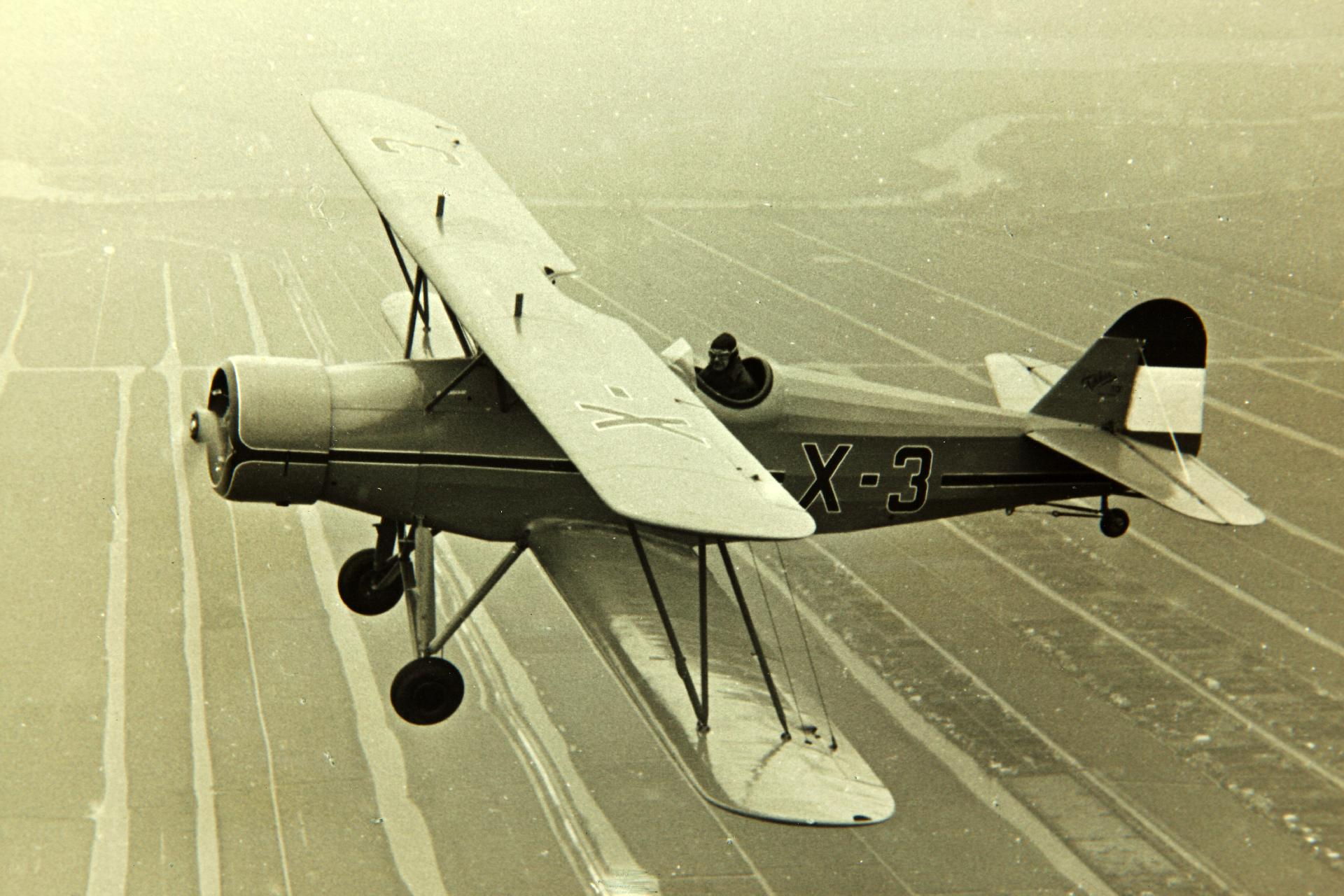
- Fokker S.IX/1

General information
- Type: Trainer
- Manufacturer: Fokker
- Primary users: Royal Netherlands Navy Royal Netherlands Army Aviation Group
- Number built: ca. 50

History
- First flight: 1 November 1937

The Fokker S.IX was a military trainer aircraft produced in the Netherlands in the mid-1930s, designed at a Royal Netherlands Navy request for a machine to replace the obsolete Fokker S.IIIs then in service. It was a conventional, single-bay biplane with staggered wings of unequal span braced with N-struts. The pilot and instructor sat in tandem, open cockpits and the undercarriage was of fixed, tailskid type with divided main units. The wing had a wooden structure, the fuselage one of welded steel tube, and the entire aircraft was fabric-covered.

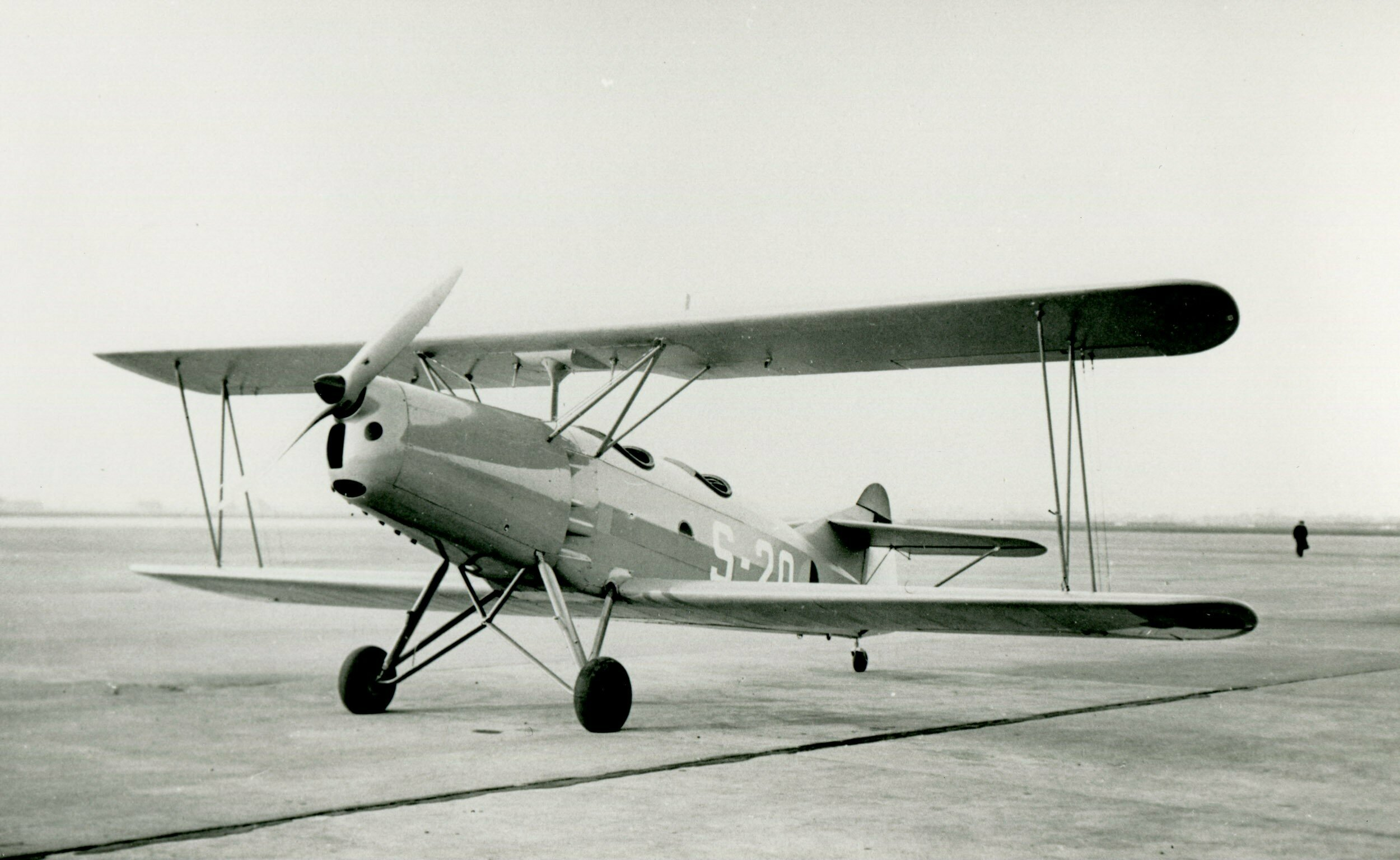
S.IX prototype

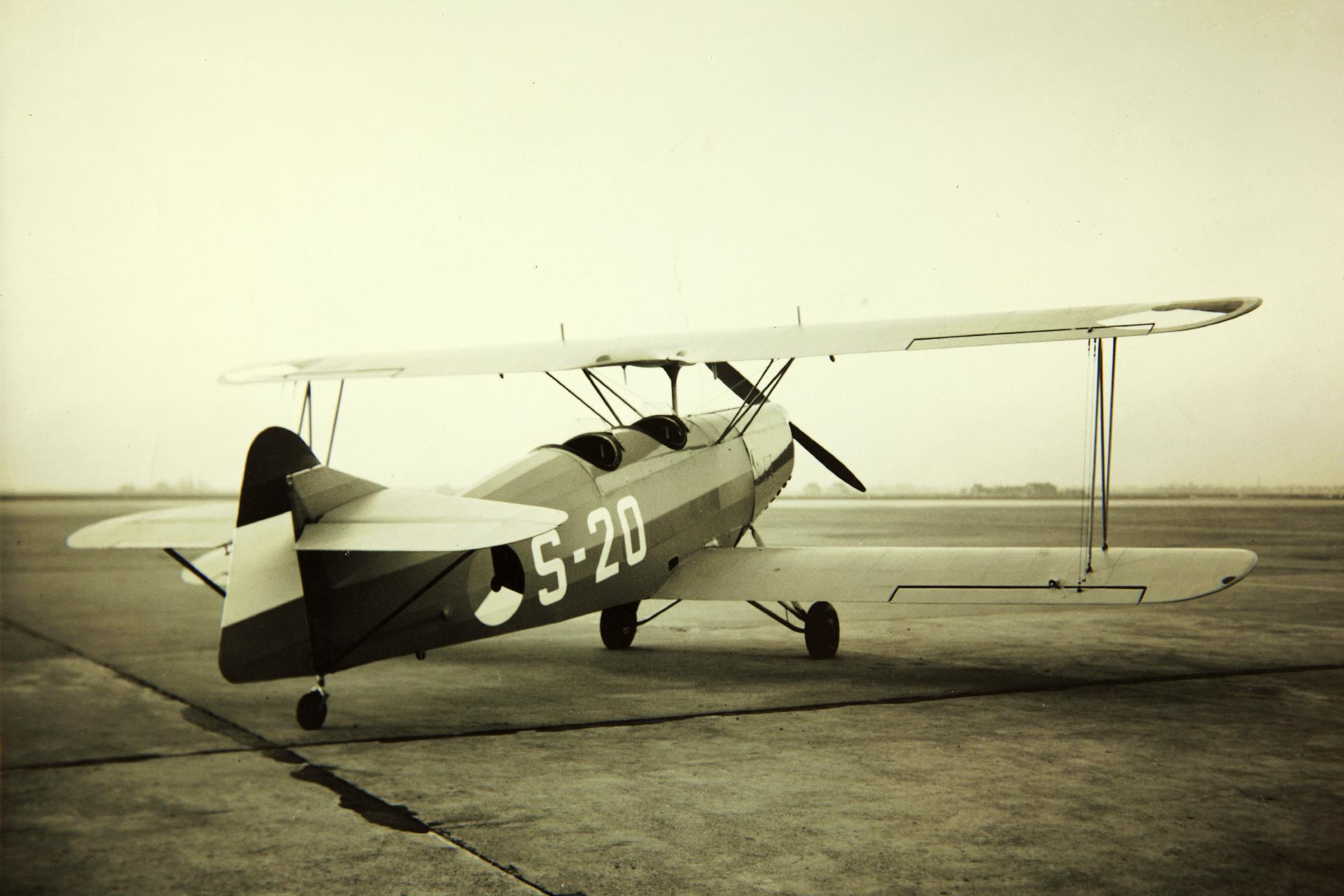
Fokker S.IX/2

The Navy approved the design and ordered 27 aircraft, later reducing this to 15. The Royal Netherlands Army Aviation Group ordered 20 examples with a different engine, following this with an order for a second batch of 20. None of these latter aircraft were delivered by the time of the German invasion of the Netherlands in 1940. On 14 May that year, a few surviving Army S.IXs escaped to France alongside some S.IVs, but never flew again.

Following the war, air charter company Frits Diepen Vliegtuigen ordered three more aircraft, which were used to train pilots into the 1950s.

== Variants ==
- S.IX/1 - version with Armstrong Siddeley Genet Major engine for Army
- S.IX/2 - version with Menasco Buccaneer engine for Navy

== Operators ==
Netherlands

- Royal Netherlands Air Force
- Royal Netherlands Navy

== Specifications (S.IX/1) ==
General characteristics

- Crew: Two, pilot and instructor
- Length: 7.65 m (25 ft 1 in)
- Wingspan: 9.55 m (31 ft 4 in)
- Height: 2.90 m (9 ft 6 in)
- Wing area: 23.0 m^{2} (248 sq ft)
- Empty weight: 695 kg (1,532 lb)
- Gross weight: 975 kg (2,150 lb)
- Powerplant: 1 × Armstrong Siddeley Genet Major , 123 kW (165 hp)

Performance

- Maximum speed: 185 km/h (115 mph, 100 kn)
- Range: 710 km (440 mi, 380 nmi)
- Service ceiling: 4,300 m (14,100 ft)
