= Tereneh Mosley =

American fashion designer

Tereneh (Mosley) Idia is a Pittsburgh-raised and internationally based fashion designer and the founder of Idia'Dega. Her work has been featured in Martha Stewart Weddings, Afropunk, Super.selected, El País online, Oreeko, Chaos Fashion Magazine, and the Pittsburgh Post-Gazette.

== Early life ==
Tereneh Idia grew up in the North Side neighborhood of Pittsburgh. She is the daughter of the American artist and sculptor Thaddeus Mosley.

== Education ==
Mosley received a BS in business from Drexel University LeBow College of Business, and, as a Rotary International Ambassadorial Scholar, an MSc in Fashion Design and Marketing from Kenyatta University in Kenya.

She has taught at the Art Institute of Pittsburgh, Parsons - The New School for Design in New York City, and was a visiting scholar at Yale - National University of Singapore and Indonesia. She recently created an eco-design collection with OMWA, the Olorgesailie Maasai Women Artisans of Kenya, which premiered during Paris Fashion Week, and has been featured in Pittsburgh and New York Fashion Week. Her collaboration with OMWA became a catalyst for Idia'Dega, Mosley's global eco-design fashion project.

== Work and Design ==
=== Idia'Dega ===
Idia'Dega is a global eco-design collaboration founded by Mosley in 2013 involving OMWA: Olorgesailie Maasai Women Artisans of Kenya. OMWA is a group of artisans and craftswomen formed by SORALO, a Maasai group dedicated to environmental and cultural conservation. Together, they designed a ten-piece collection of clothing and accessories for men and women called The Tomon Collection. The Tomon Collection was shown as part of New York Fashion Week in 2014 at the Warehouse Gallery in Brooklyn. In 2016, the collaboration expanded to include Holly Gibson and The Beading Wolves of the Oneida Indian Nation. Their work has been featured in New York, New York; Paris, France; Nairobi, Kenya; and Pittsburgh, Pennsylvania.

In 2016, the spring 2017 Maasai Plum and Oneida Strawberry collection were shown at New York Fashion Week.

In 2017 Idia'Dega exhibited as part of New York Fashion Week debuting the Blue Collection, which was inspired by the three rivers of Pittsburgh and the context of the color in Kenyan culture as a symbol for generosity.
