= Menasco Buccaneer =

American aircraft engine

Buccaneer
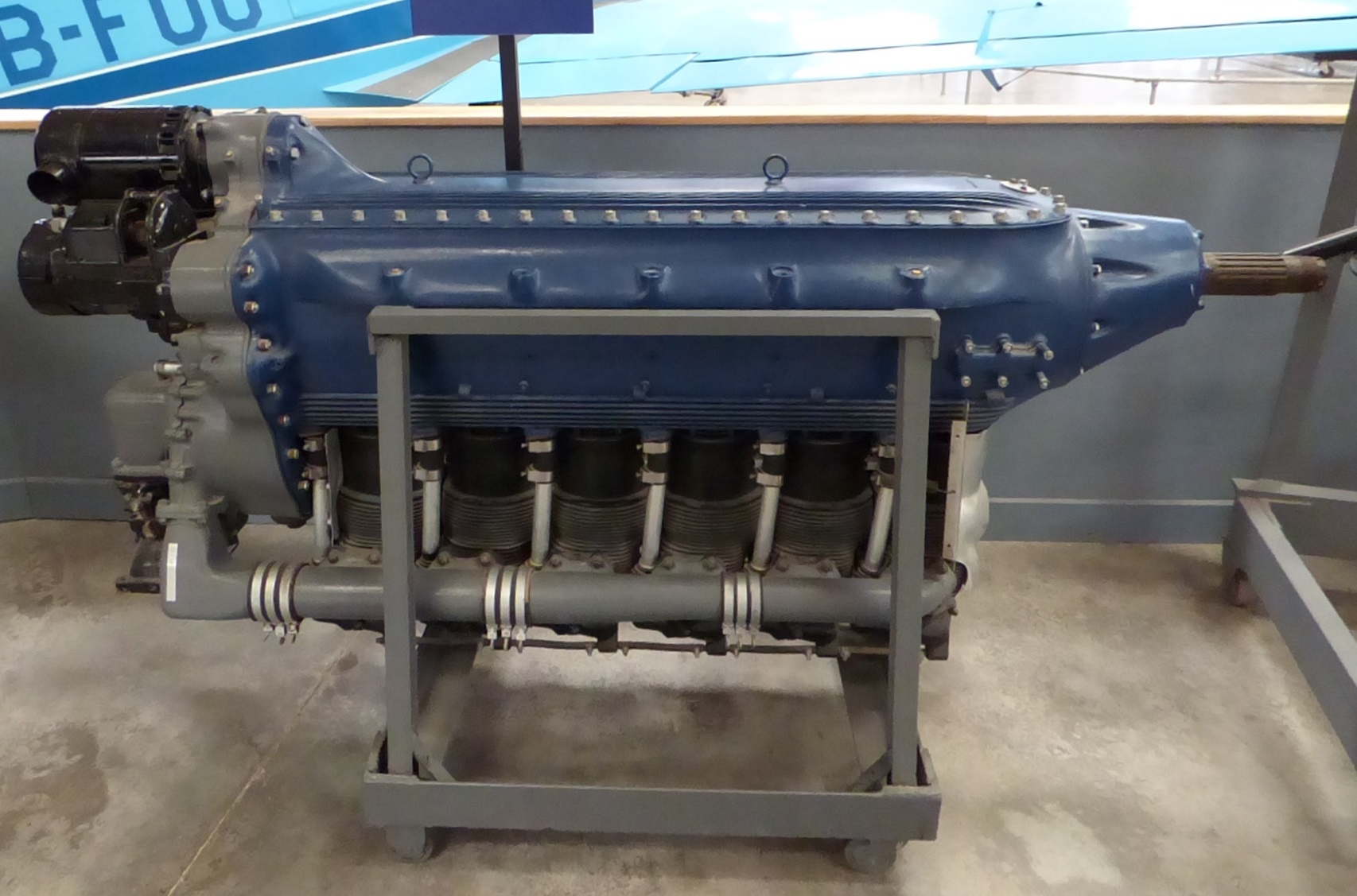
- Menasco C6S-4 Super Buccaneer inline, Pima Air Museum, Tucson AZ
- National origin: United States of America
- Manufacturer: Menasco Motors Company

The Menasco Buccaneer was a series of popular six-cylinder, air-cooled, in-line, inverted, aero-engines that were manufactured by Menasco Motors Company for light general aviation and sport aircraft during the 1930s and 1940s.

The six-cylinder Menasco engines had the name Buccaneer, while the four-cylinder engines had the name Pirate. The Menasco engines came in both supercharged and normally aspirated models. The supercharged models, with the S suffix added to their designation, had superior performance at higher altitudes with a relatively small increase in dimensions and weight.

== Variants ==
Menasco A6 Buccaneer
Menasco B6 Buccaneer
Menasco B6S Buccaneer
Menasco C6 Buccaneer
Menasco C6S Super Buccaneer
Menasco D6 Super Buccaneer

== Applications ==
- Alcor C-6-1 Junior
- Bellanca 28-92
- Brown B-2 Racer
- Brown B-3
- Chester Goon
- Crosby CR-4
- Fokker S.IX/2
- Folkerts SK-3
- Howard DGA-4
- Miles Mohawk
- Miles Peregrine
- Northrop Beta 3
- Northrop N-9M
- PZL.26
- Rider R-6
- VEF I-14
- Waco Custom Cabin MGC-8

== Specifications (Menasco B6S Buccaneer) ==
=== General characteristics ===
- Type: 6-cylinder, air-cooled, in-line, inverted engine
- Bore: 4.5 in (114 mm)
- Stroke: 5.125 in (130 mm)
- Displacement: 489 cu in (8 L)
- Length: 60.125 in (1,527 mm)
- Width: 15 in (381 mm)
- Height: 28.3 in (719 mm)
- Dry weight: 423 lb (192 kg)

=== Components ===
- Valvetrain: 1 inlet and 1 exhaust valve per cylinder
- Fuel system: 1 Stromberg carburetor
- Fuel type: 73 octane
- Cooling system: Air

=== Performance ===
- Power output: 200hp at 2,250 rpm max/150hp at 2,025 rpm cruise
- Compression ratio: 5.5:1
- Power-to-weight ratio: 2.82 lb/hp at cruise

== See also ==
Comparable engines

- Alfa Romeo 115
- Argus As 17
- de Havilland Gipsy Queen
- de Havilland Gipsy Six
- Hirth HM 506
- Isotta Fraschini Beta
- Napier Javelin
- Ranger L-440
- Renault 6Q

Related lists

- List of aircraft engines
