= National Air Races =

Series of air races

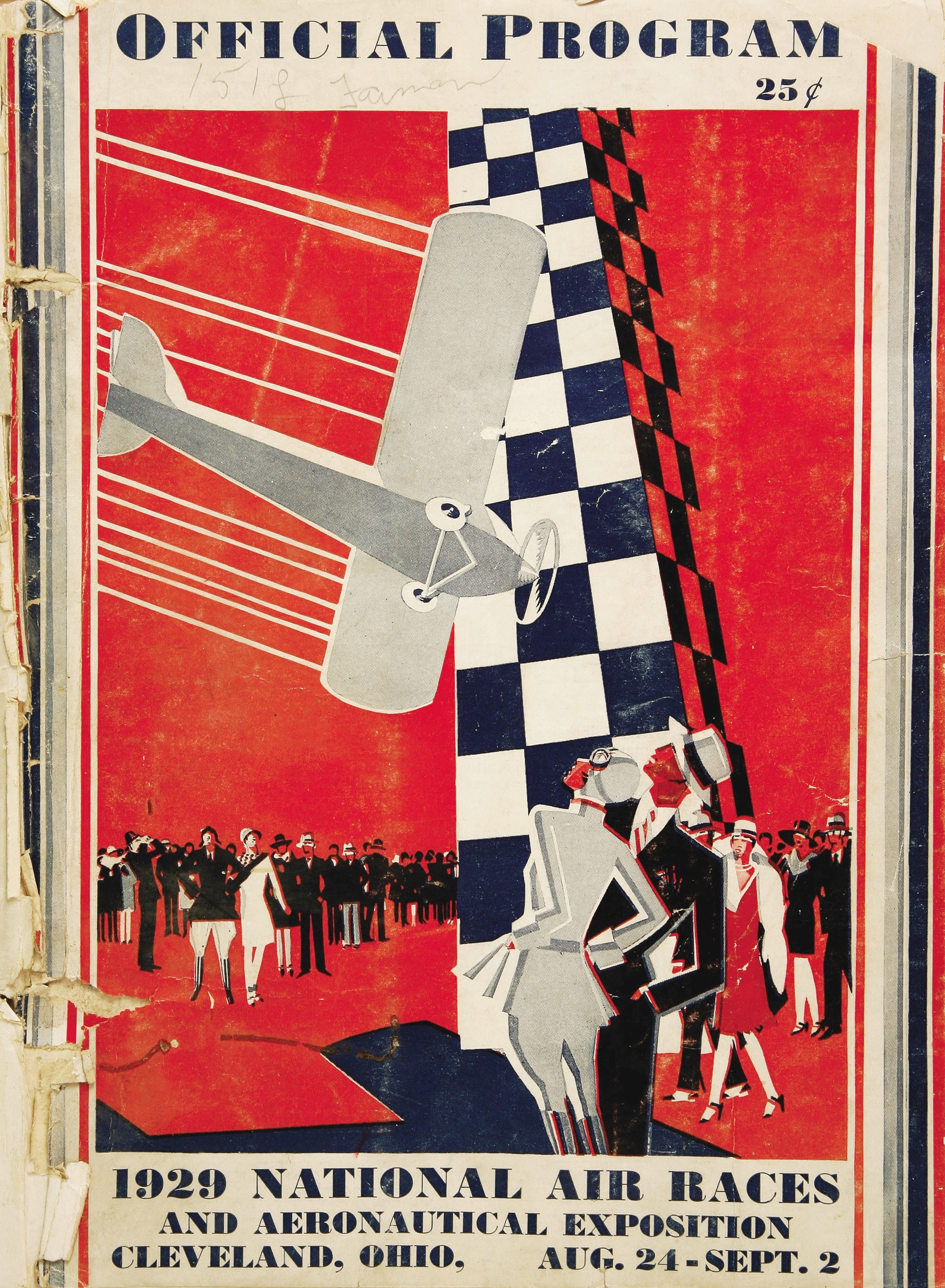
Official program for the National Air Races of 1929 in Cleveland

The National Air Races (also known as Pulitzer Trophy Races) are a series of pylon and cross-country races that have taken place in the United States since 1920. The science of aviation, and the speed and reliability of aircraft and engines grew rapidly during this period; the National Air Races were both a proving ground and showcase for this.

== History ==
In 1920, publisher Ralph Pulitzer sponsored the Pulitzer Trophy Race and the Pulitzer Speed Trophy for military airplanes at Roosevelt Field, Long Island, New York, in an effort to publicize aviation and his newspaper. The races eventually moved to Cleveland, in 1929, where they were known as the Cleveland National Air Races. They drew the best flyers of the time, including James Doolittle, Wiley Post, Tex Rankin, Frank Hawks, Jimmy Wedell, Roscoe Turner, and others from the pioneer age of aviation. These air races helped to inspire Donald Blakeslee as a young boy. Other races included in the U.S. National Air Races were the Mitchell Trophy Race, the Town & Country Club Race for civilians, the Kansas City Rotary Club Trophy "for all three military services," and the Glenn Curtiss Trophy Race for "biplanes with engines having less than 510 cubic inches (8,400 cm^{3})."

Starting in 1929, the races usually ran for up to 10 days, usually from late August to early September to include Labor Day. Aviation promoter Cliff Henderson was managing director of the National Air Races from 1928 to 1939. During World War II the races were on hiatus.

The races included a variety of events, including cross-country races originating in Portland, Oakland, and Los Angeles, with a final destination in Cleveland. Also included were landing contests, glider demonstrations, airship flights, and parachute-jumping contests. The more popular events were the Thompson Trophy Races which started in 1929; a closed-course race where aviators raced their planes around pylons; and the Bendix Trophy Race, the "transcontinental air race," across most of the USA starting in 1931.

In 1929, a Santa Monica, California to Cleveland, Ohio route was started for the Women's Air Derby (nicknamed the "Powder Puff Derby"), featuring well-known female pilots such as Amelia Earhart, Pancho Barnes, Bobbi Trout, and Louise Thaden. Thaden was the winner in the heavy Class D (engines with 510–810 cubic inches (8,400–13,300 cm^{3})), while Phoebe Omlie won the light Class C (engines with 275–510 cubic inches (4,510–8,360 cm^{3})). This was also the year for the first female pylon race, the winner of which was awarded the Aerol Trophy beginning in 1931.

In Chicago, on the last day of the 1930 trophy race (September 1), USMC Captain Arthur Page crashed his modified Curtiss Hawk Seaplane F6C-3, and died of his injuries later that day.

After being on hiatus during the U.S. participation in World War II, the post-war races featured newer surplus military planes that greatly outclassed the planes from the pre-war era. In 1949 Bill Odom lost control of his P-51 Beguine and crashed into a Cleveland-area home, killing himself and two people. The races went on hiatus again.

Though the events specific to Cleveland were in suspension, the cross country races for the Thompson, Bendix, and G.E. trophies continued. Three B-47s flew cross country from March Air Force Base to the Philadelphia International Airport as participants in the 1955 Labor Day race. In the 1956 event, three B-47s participated in the G.E. Trophy race for Jet Bombers, flying from Kindley Field, Bermuda, to Oklahoma City. One of these set a course speed record of 601.187 mph (967.517 km/h).

The annual event resumed in 1964 as the Reno National Championship Air Races, taking place in mid-September. The Cleveland National Air Show also began in 1964.

National Air Races were run by U.S. Air Race, Inc. from 1995–2007. The company was founded by famed World Race Gold Medalist Marion P. Jayne and after her death from cancer in 1996, was run by her daughter Patricia Jayne (Pat) Keefer, 1994 World Race Gold Medalist. Under Keefer's leadership, the events tabulated a perfect safety record with nearly 600,000 miles raced, over 3,200 safe landings at 81 different airports in 43 states and two countries in 25 events. With the help of hundreds of volunteers and over 250 different sponsors she awarded 26 Learn-to-Fly scholarships and reached an estimated 20 million people with a positive message about General Aviation.

== Locations, dates, Pulitzer Trophy winners and speeds ==
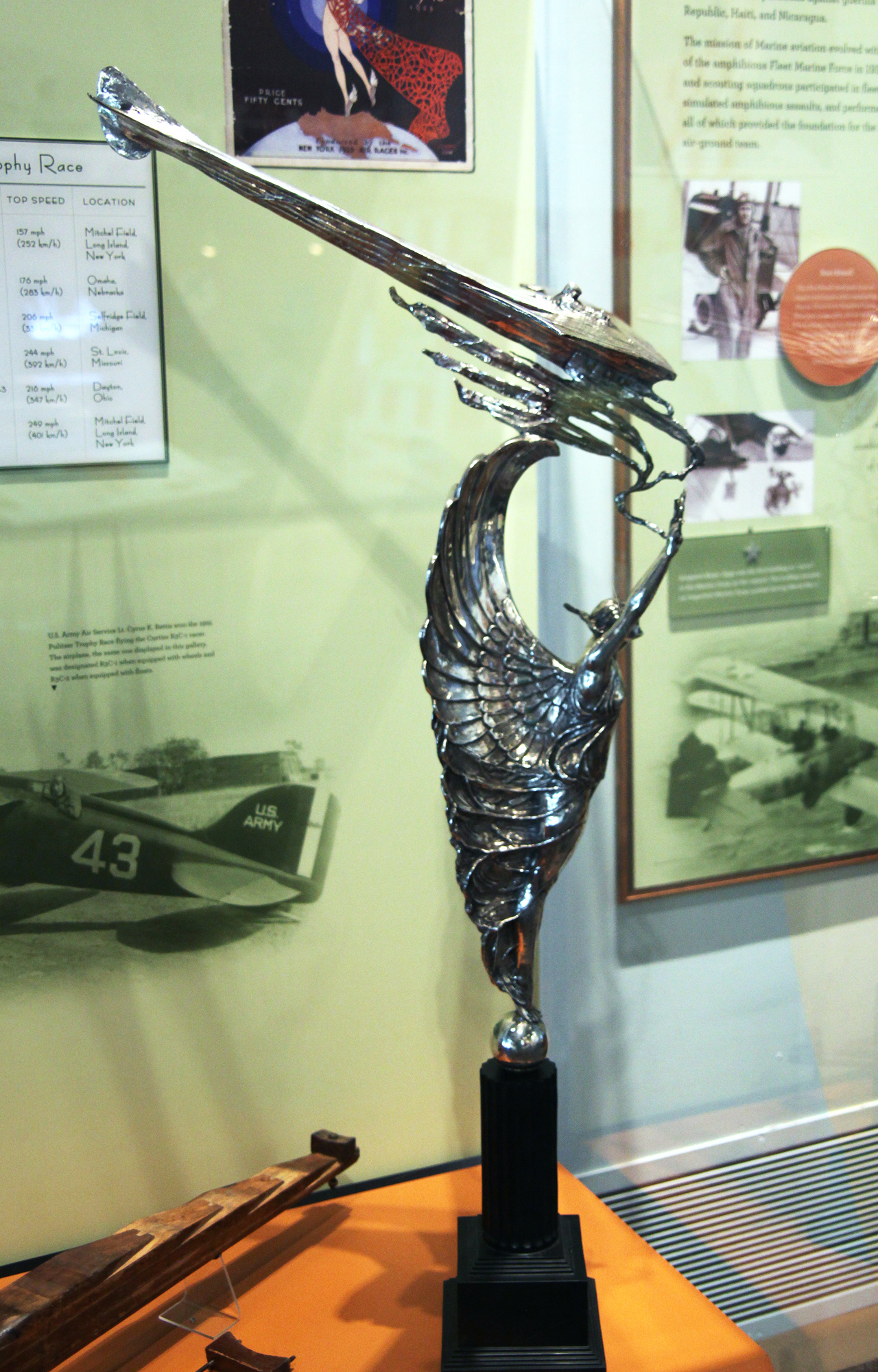
The Pulitzer Trophy on display in 2012 in the Smithsonian National Air and Space Museum

- 1920 Mitchel Field, New York, 25 November, C. C. Moseley, 156.54 mph over a 29-mile triangle course
- 1921 Omaha, Nebraska, 3 November, Bert Acosta, 176.75 mph over a 30.7 mile triangle course
- 1922 Selfridge Field, Michigan, 14 October, Russell Maughan, 205.86 mph over a 31.1 mile course
- 1923 St. Louis Flying Field, Missouri, 6 October, Al Williams, 243.67 mph over a 31.1 mile course
- 1924 Wilbur Wright Field, Ohio, 4 October, Harry Mills, 216.55 mph
- 1925 Mitchel Field, Long Island, New York, 10–12 October, Cyrus K. Bettis, 248.98 mph
- 1926 Model Farms Field, Philadelphia, Pennsylvania, 4–13 September
- 1927 Felts Field, Spokane, Washington, 21–25 September
- 1928 Mines Field, Los Angeles, California, 8–16 September
- 1929 Cleveland Municipal Airport, Cleveland, Ohio, 24 August-2 September
- 1930 Curtiss-Reynolds Field, Chicago, Illinois, 23 August–September 1
- 1931 Cleveland, Ohio, August 29-September 7
- 1932 Cleveland, Ohio, 27 August-5 September
- 1933 Mines Field, Los Angeles, California, 1–4 July
- 1934 Cleveland, Ohio, August 31-September 4
- 1935 Cleveland, Ohio, August 30-September 2
- 1936 Mines Field, Los Angeles, California, September 4–7, Michel Détroyat on Caudron C.460
- 1937 Cleveland, Ohio, September 3–7
- 1938 Cleveland, Ohio, September 3–5
- 1939 Cleveland, Ohio, September 2–5
- 1940 to 1945 Hiatus for World War II
- 1946 Cleveland Municipal Airport, Cleveland, Ohio, 31 August-2 September, Tex Johnston
- 1947 Cleveland, Ohio, 30 August-1 September
- 1948 Cleveland, Ohio, 2–4 September
- 1949 Cleveland, Ohio, 3–5 September
- 1950 to 1963 Hiatus after crash
- 1964 Resumption as "The National Championship Air Races" in Reno, Nevada
- 1964 Indirect successor as the Cleveland National Air Show

== See also ==
- Gordon Bennett Trophy (aeroplanes)
- Dole Air Race
- Halle Trophy Race
- Schneider Trophy
