= Walter Mosley (lawyer) =

American lawyer

Walter Mosley is an American lawyer who specializes in entertainment, media and technology at Mosley and Associates. Mosley represented Blac Chyna in a lawsuit against Kim Kardashian in 2018. As the case progressed in court, Mosley reportedly received threats to life from unnamed persons on social media platform, Instagram for leading the case against Kardashian. In 2017, Mosley was the attorney who represented DeMario Jackson, a contestant in Bachelor In Paradise show on ABC's dating series in a ligation against abrupt shutting down of the program. He is a graduate of Harvard Law School.

== Education and career ==
Mosley earned a first degree in computer engineering from the University of Michigan (1996–2000) and later received an MSc in information, economics and management, majoring in incentive-centered design. He holds a JD from Harvard Law School (2005). He is a member of the California and New York states bars as well as the Federal Tax Court and the Sixth Circuit Court of Appeals.

He began his legal career as a clerk to Judge Damon J. Keith on the United States Court of Appeals for the Sixth Circuit. His legal practice centered on Labor & Employment, Corporate Transactions, Entertainment, Hospitality and Real Estate. Mosley represents Debbie Allen Dance Academy – a Los Angeles-based non-profit organization. Before venturing into entertainment and media law practice, he spent four years as a corporate lawyer in the Los Angeles and New York offices of Skadden, Arps, Slate, Meagher & Flom LLP and was Head of Business Affairs and General Counsel at Smith Global, Inc. (a Smith Family entertainment company) for two years.

He had a stint in engineering profession when he worked with Intel Corporation as a chip designer and software engineer and later moved to telecommunication firms in Nigeria, Ghana and South Africa.
