= C. C. Moseley =

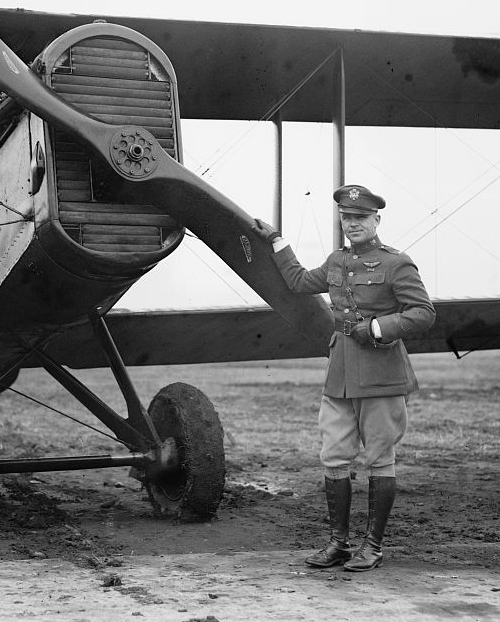
Moseley in 1924.

Corliss Champion Moseley (July 23, 1894 – 1974) was a United States Army aviator and later civilian trainer. He won the inaugural Pulitzer Air Race in 1920. Following his service in World War I, where he was credited with one aerial victory, he was placed in charge of all United States Army Air Service schools. As a civilian, he set up flying schools which are estimated to have taught over 25,000 pilots and 5000 mechanics, mostly for service in World War II. He was also a business executive, either helping found or organize Western Air Express (which later became Western Airlines).

== Early life ==
Moseley was born in Boise, Idaho, and attended Long Beach High School and the University of Southern California (1914–1917).

== Military service ==
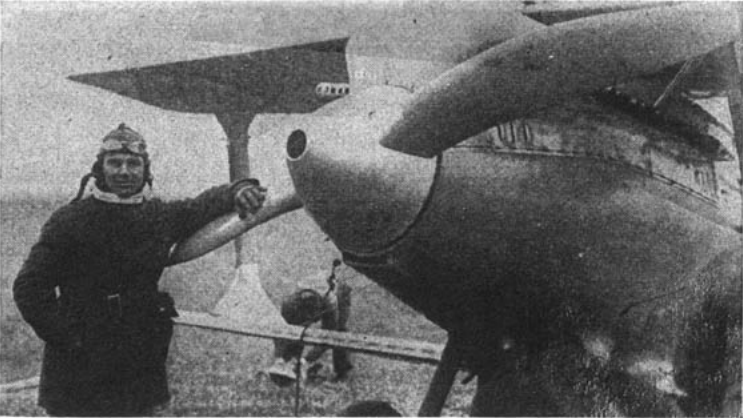
Moseley after piloting the R-1 Racer to victory at the 1920 National Air Races in New York.

He enlisted in the United States Army and, after graduating from the School of Military Aeronautics in Berkeley, California, he was assigned to the 27th Pursuit Squadron of the 1st Pursuit Group in France. In World War I, he was credited with one victory.

After the war, he was a test pilot and later commandant of the Primary Flying School at Carlstrom Field in Arcadia, Florida. He then went to Washington, D.C. as a member of General Billy Mitchell's staff, and was placed in charge of all Army Air Service schools. In 1920, Lieutenant Moseley won the first Pulitzer Air Race, flying a Verville-Packard R-1 at a then record speed of about 178 miles per hour (286 km/h). In 1924, he organized and commanded an air unit of the California National Guard based either in Los Angeles or Santa Monica.

He resigned from the Army as a major in 1924 or 1925.

== Later life ==
Moseley was either a co-founder or organizer of Western Air Express, the predecessor of Western Airlines. He served as the company's vice president and operations manager until February 1, 1929. He also "became vice president and western manager for the Curtiss-Wright Airport Corp., and a director of Maddux Airlines." Curtiss-Wright assigned him to Grand Central Air Terminal in Glendale, California, and by 1932 he was its manager.

It was at Grand Central that he established the first of his private flying schools, Curtiss-Wright Technical Institute (later renamed Cal-Aero Academy). It trained aircraft technicians, mechanics and engineers. With war looming on the horizon, General Hap Arnold invited Moseley, Oliver Parks and Theopholis Lee to Washington in October 1938. He asked them to set up flying schools across the country to take the burden of primary training off the shoulders of the Air Corps; all three agreed, even though Arnold admitted that "I didn't have any money but was sure I could get the support of Congress in the next appropriations bill" and the cost to each would be several hundred thousand dollars. This was the Civilian Pilot Training Program. Moseley founded Cal Aero Academy in Chino, California, and Polaris Flight Academy in Lancaster, California, in 1941, prior to America's entry in World War II, and Mira Loma Flight Academy in Oxnard, California. Royal Air Force and Eagle Squadron personnel trained at Polaris under Lend Lease. It is estimated that his schools produced over 25,000 pilots and 5000 mechanics, mostly for World War II.

In 1952, he founded the Grand Central Rocket Company, the predecessor of the Lockheed Propulsion Company.
