= John Moseley =

American lieutenant colonel

John Moseley (or Mosley) was a lieutenant colonel in the Parliamentarian Army and Governor of Aylesbury during the First English Civil War.

In November 1643 Sir Thomas Ogle indicated to the Royalist peace faction that Moseley might be prepared to surrender Aylesbury to their forces, as Charles I attempted to summon a new Parliament at Oxford. This initiative was accompanied by an offer of a free and general pardon and a call to rid England of the Scottish Presbyterians who were currently negotiating with the Parliament at Westminster.

On 26 January 1644 he was formally thanked by the House of Lords for his loyalty to the parliamentarian cause.
