= Eleanor Mosley =

English milliner, businesswoman

Eleanor Mosley (or Elinor Mosely; 1700–?) was an English milliner and a member in the Worshipful Company of Clockmakers. Mosley successfully ran her own millinery business as a single woman in eighteenth-century London.

== Life and career ==
Eleanor Mosley was the daughter of a successful apothecary in York, England. In April 1718, when she was seventeen years old, she was entered into an apprenticeship to George Tyler and his wife, Lucy. The apprenticeship was registered with the Worshipful Company of Clockmakers, of which George Tyler was a registered member or master. Between 1714 and 1725, George and Lucy Tyler took on six young women as apprentices. Since George Tyler was registered as a clockmaker with the Clockmakers' Company, it is likely these young women were actually apprenticed to his wife Lucy.

In 1727, Mosley completed her apprenticeship, became a member, or mistress, in her own right of the Clockmakers' Company, and set up her own business in London. That same year, she took on her own sister, Catherine, as an apprentice and one month later took a second apprentice, Mary Bate, the daughter of a clergyman from Kent. She was paid £50 for each girl. At least two other of Mosley's sisters were also milliners - Elizabeth, who was apprenticed to a milliner in York; and Dorothy, who eventually took over Mosley's business.

Mosley moved her business to a rented shop on Lombard Street in 1729 and in 1736 was able to purchase her own property on nearby Gracechurch Street. She lived and worked at this location with her apprentices for at least a decade. This area of London around Lombard and Gracechurch Streets was the principal market area of the city and home to wealthy merchants such as goldsmiths, mercers, apothecaries, and bankers. In 1732, Mosley took on her third apprentice, Mary Newton, the daughter of a London goldsmith. Eleanor's first two apprentices completed their apprenticeships in 1734 and she then took on her fourth apprentice that same year. She took on two apprentices in 1738 and her seventh, and final, registered apprentice in 1739. Eleanor apparently was the sole proprietor of her business, as no other names were recorded on the tax roles as business partner or co-owner. In addition to her apprentices, Eleanor probably had domestic servants to run her household and possibly other shop assistants.

The Clockmakers' Company recorded Mosley's marriage in 1747 (although she may have actually married in 1744) when she was in her forties. Mosley's marriage happened rather late in life, however it was not unheard of in this time period. Although the property on Gracechurch Street remained in her maiden name, after 1744 she no longer lived there. The name of Mosley's husband was not recorded in the Clockmakers' Company registers and it is unknown whether she continued in business in another location, took on any more apprentices, or even remained in London. It would not have been unusual for Mosley to have remained in business of some sort after her marriage, as most women in eighteenth-century London continued to work after getting married. In 1749, Eleanor's sister Dorothy started renting the shop from Eleanor. The last official mention of Eleanor Mosley was in 1752 when Dorothy took possession of the property. It is not known if Dorothy Mosley bought the property or if she inherited it due to Eleanor's death.

In a time when most unmarried women worked as domestic servants, Mosley was both a trained craftswoman as well as a businesswoman who successfully ran her own shop for at least fifteen years in a well-to-do area of London. Additionally, she was a member of a livery company in her own right - most women acquired membership through their husbands. Mosley commanded high apprenticeship premiums and never had less than two apprentices at any one time. After marrying in her forties, she passed her business on to her sister.

== London livery companies (trade guilds) and apprenticeships ==
Although guilds had been formed around specific trades, by the eighteenth century many of the London guilds, known as Livery Companies, no longer had monopoly control of their indicated trades. Only a few companies by this time specified the actual trade to be practiced by its members, so members of the company could practice a trade completely unrelated to the named trade of the company. In order to run a business and trade within the walls of the City of London, membership in one of the companies was required for both men (known as masters) and women (known as mistresses).

Milliners did not have a trade company of their own so they had to belong to other companies. Only Mosley and one other woman were recorded in the Clockmakers' records as milliners among the female members of the company, although it is highly likely other women were also milliners. Some companies did continue to specify which trade could be practiced by their members and among those more milliners are found. Although female membership in the companies accounted for only one to two percent of the total membership, a significant number of them were milliners. In the Haberdashers' Company nearly half of the girls apprenticed in the first half of the eighteenth century were apprenticed to milliners. In the Grocers' Company, two-thirds of the girls apprenticed between 1717 and 1743 were to milliners. In the Clothworkers' Company, of the eighty apprenticeships where the trade was noted, 25 were to milliners.

Membership in a guild could be attained through completing an apprenticeship (which is what Mosley did), through one's father, purchasing a membership, or by marriage. Wives could claim membership through their husbands and conversely they could transfer membership to their husbands when they married. Most women gained membership through their husbands.

For company apprenticeships, parents paid a premium to the master or mistress. Apprenticeships started when children were in their teens and lasted seven years. The premiums paid for a millinery apprenticeship were relatively high - approximately the same amount as might be required to apprentice a boy to a merchant or apothecary.

== Milliners ==
The traditional definition of a milliner differs from the definition used now which exclusively means hatmaker. The Oxford English Dictionary defines an eighteenth-century milliner as "a haberdasher of small wares; seller of fancy wares, accessories and apparel, either originally (deriving from) those wares coming from Milan or from selling a thousand things." However, there may be another derivation of the word. According to the Berg Companion to Fashion, milliner derives from the word "Millaner" which referred to merchants from the city of Milan who traveled to northern Europe with a variety of goods, such as silk, ribbons, lace, ornaments, and other general finery. They also brought news of the latest styles and variations on dress and served both men and women. The term dates to the early sixteenth century. Milliners also would have dealt in the fine straw hats from Florence which may have led to some to settle on hat making.

Although no trade cards belonging to Eleanor Mosley have been found, these trade cards from c.1757-1758 show the variety of goods a milliner might carry.

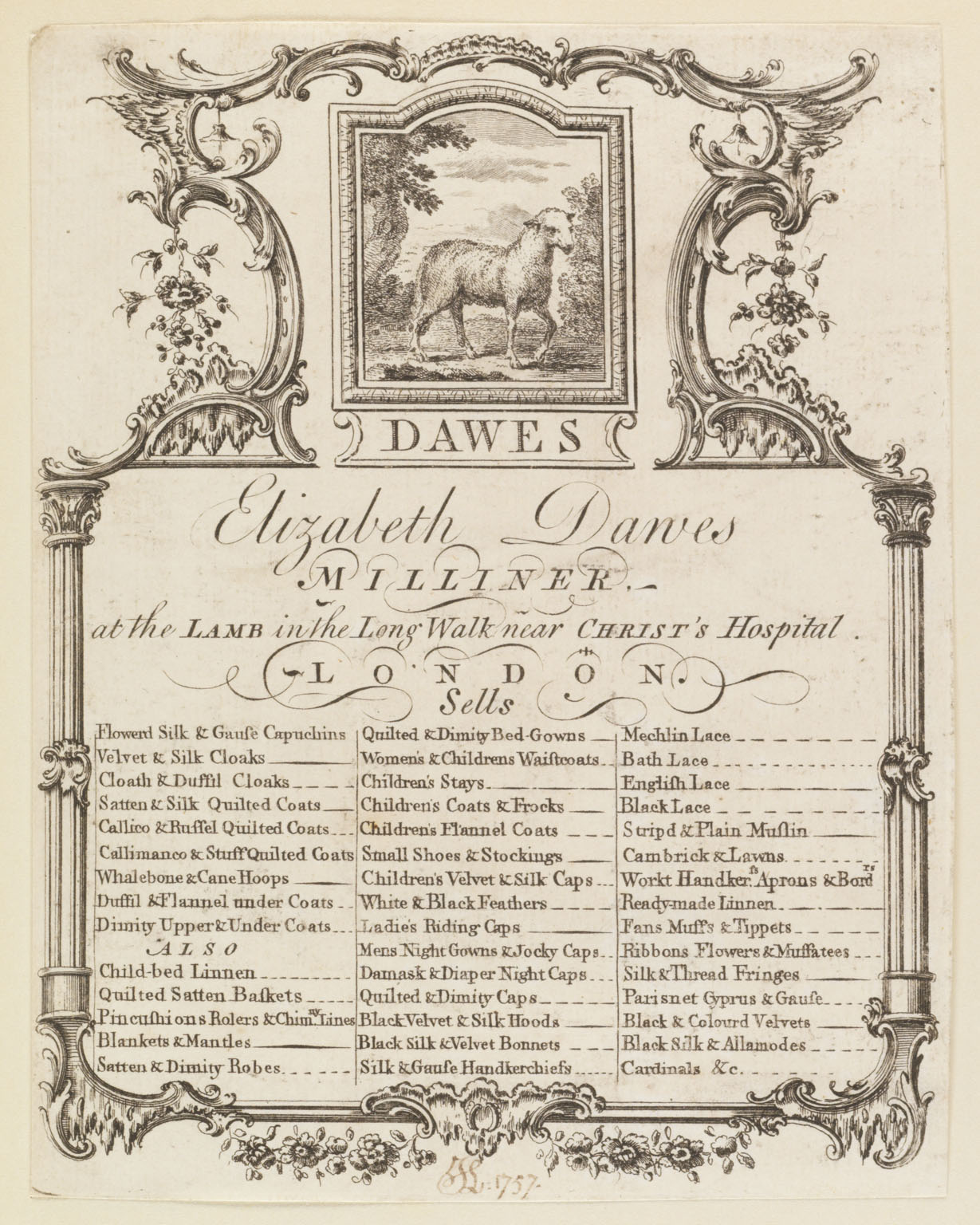
Image courtesy of Lewis Walpole Library lwlpr21073

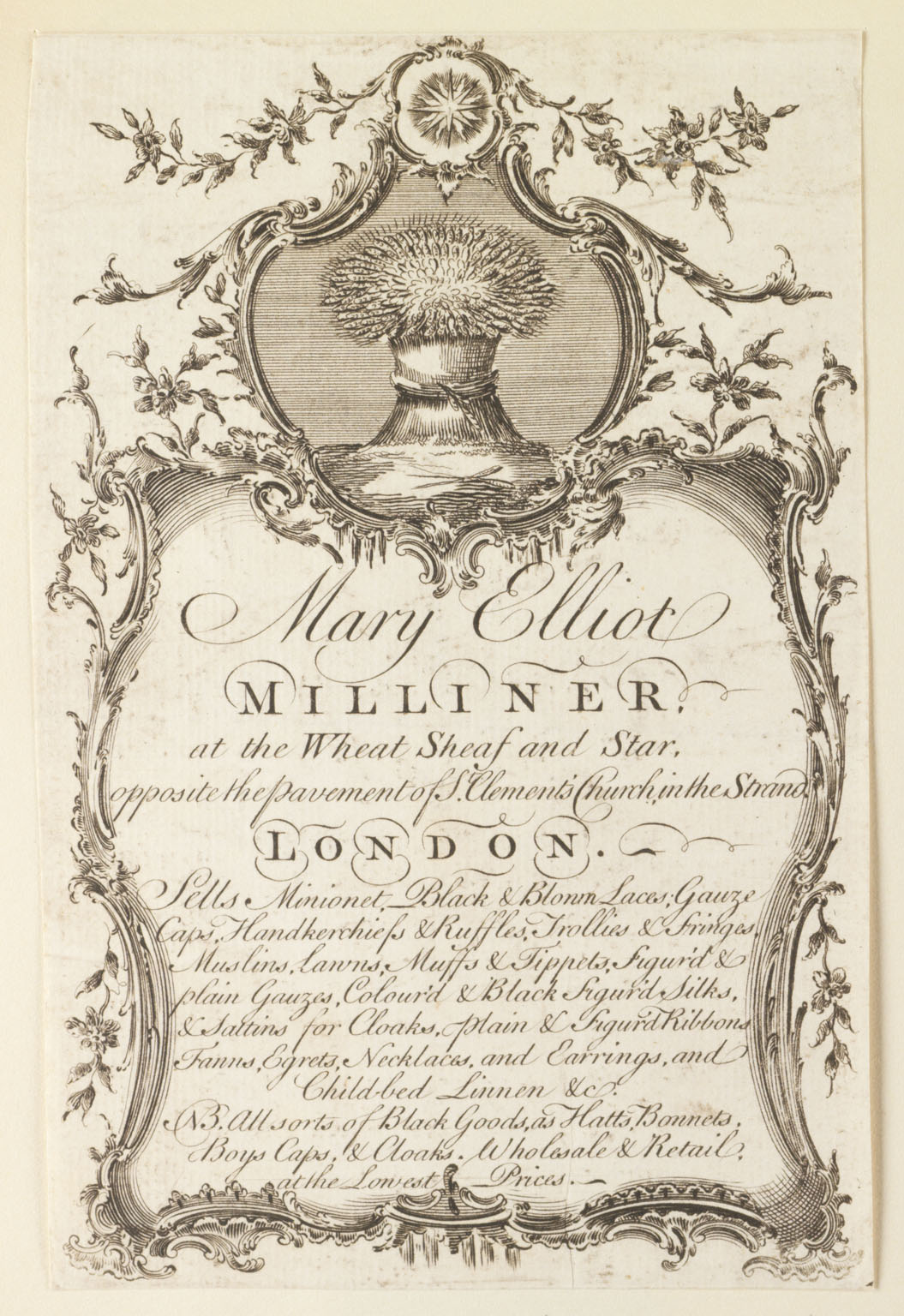
Image courtesy of Lewis Walpole Library lwlpr21074

In 1747, The London Tradesman (a guide to the trades) gave a list of a milliner's responsibilities: "The Milliner is concerned in making and providing the Ladies with Linen of all sorts, fit for Wearing Apparel, from the Holland Smock to the Tippet...the Milliner furnishes them with Holland, Cambrickm Lawn and Lace of all sorts and makes these Materials into Smocks, Aprons, Tippers, Handkerchiefs, Neckties, Ruffles, Mobs, Caps. The make up Cloaks, Manteels, Mantelets, Cheens and Capucheens of Silk, Velvet, plain or brocaded and trim them with Silver and Gold Lace or Black Lace. They make up and sell Hats, Hoods, and Caps of all Sorts and Materials; they find them in Gloves, Muffs and Ribbons: they sell Petticoats and Hoops of all Sizes." In the seventeenth century, milliners were predominantly men but a change in fashionable dress for women led to milliners being mostly women. The mantua, an open-front gown with a loose-fitting unboned bodice cut all in one piece with the skirt, much like an overrobe became popular. The gown was worn over a corset and petticoat and the skirts of the gown were draped up to reveal the petticoat. The mantua started as an informal at-home gown but evolved into a more formal style that became acceptable at court. The gap in the front of the bodice was filled in with a stomacher which were often covered with lace, ribbons, and various other trimmings. Previously, most women's clothing had been made by tailors but this new style was easier to make and seamstresses moved into making mantuas. Before this seamstresses mostly made simple items such as shirts, chemises, cuffs, and collars. Even as the style of the mantua became more complicated and went out of style, women continued to make all sorts of clothing for women and the term mantuamaker became synonymous with dressmaker.

Female milliners rose from the ranks of the mantuamakers and sat atop the hierarchy employing the mantuamakers, seamstresses, and other specialists. Milliners often offered more than one service. A compilation of occupations listed in ads by women in business in England between 1760 and 1830 showed milliner combined with over a dozen other trades such as blackworker (embroiderer), draper, dressmaker, stationer, toy dealer, straw hat maker, haberdasher and furnisher of funerals. The cut and style of dresses throughout much of the eighteenth century did not change much making the trimmings of even more importance - many of which came directly from the milliner. Clothing was the second biggest expense in the eighteenth century after food and as such was often remade or restyled. From the style of dress, to trimmings, accessories, caps, and remaking of gowns the milliner was an important source of materials and advice on the latest style

== Image and reputation ==
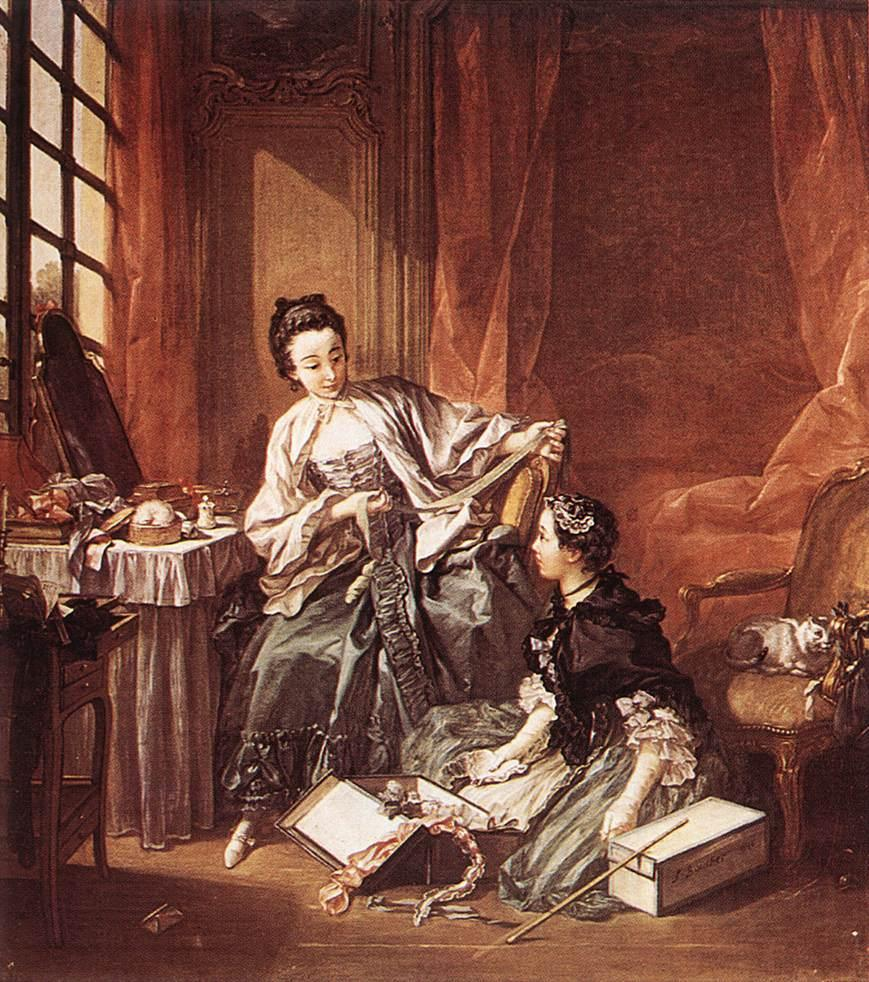
François Boucher - The Milliner (The Morning) - WGA02892

Milliners had to be their own best advertising and subsequently, they and their apprentices and shop girls were well dressed in the latest styles. Even if they had their own shop, milliners or their employees often had to visit the homes of their clients to show them goods or to deliver finished items. The painting by François Boucher, The Milliner (The Morning) has come to personify the image of the milliner: a well-dressed young woman with the tools of her trade - her bandboxes, trims, and wooden stick for taking measurements.

This print by Denis Diderot from his Encyclopédie shows a dressmakers shop filled with well-dressed respectable young women helping female customers choose from a variety of dresses and accessories. Mosley's own shop was likely quite similar.

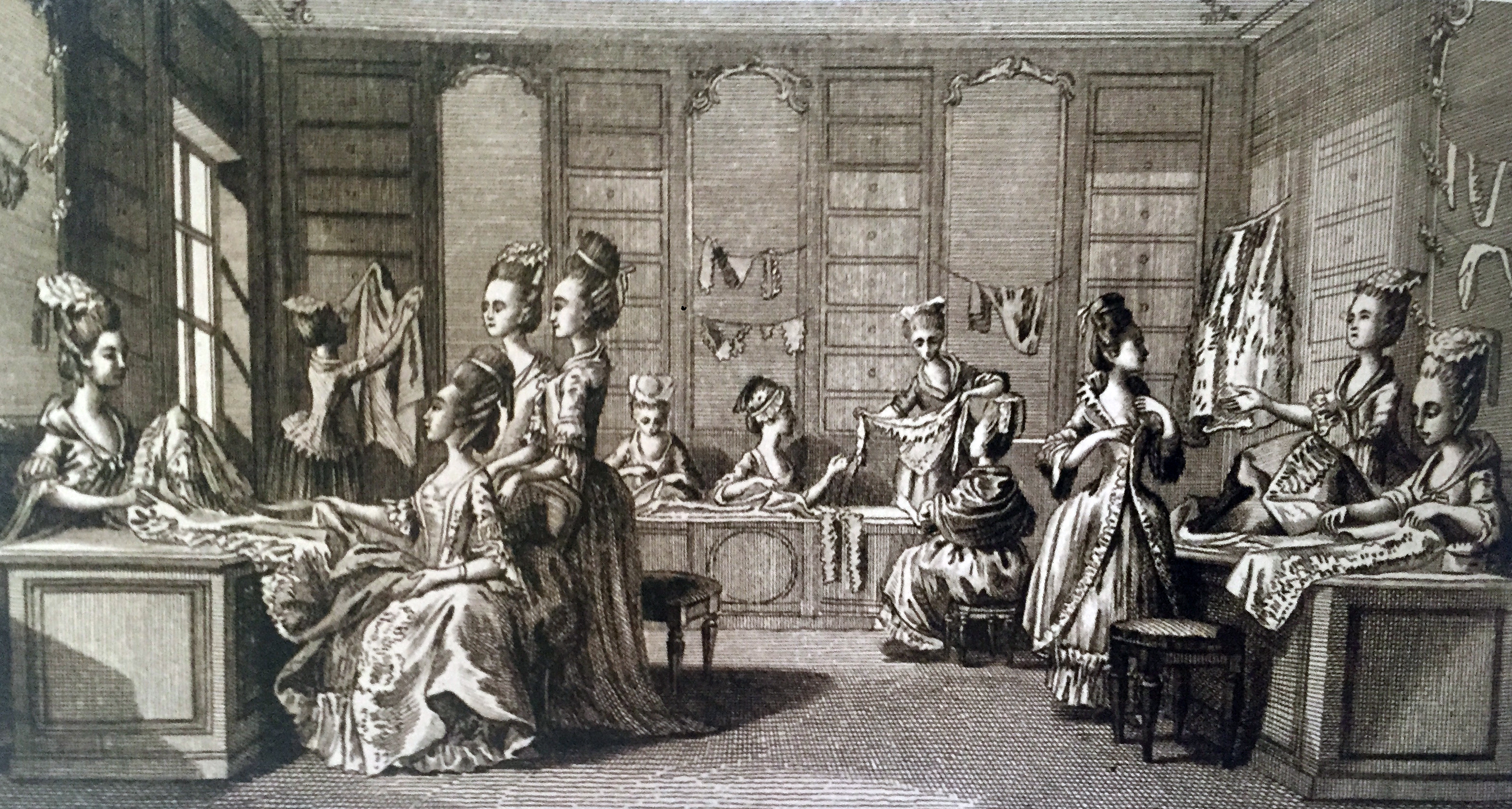
La Marchande de modes Bénard

Other images, such as Robert Dighton's A Mourning Ramble shows young women who seem to be more interested in flirting with male customers than in making sales. This satirical print by James Caldwell compares the "Charming Millener" to a demirep (which is a woman of questionable morals).

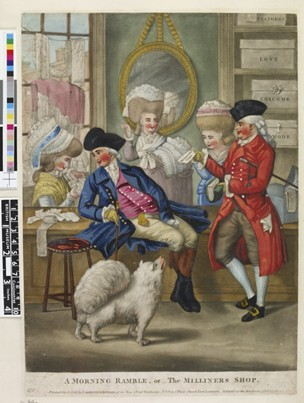
Courtesy of British Museum #1935,0522.1.31

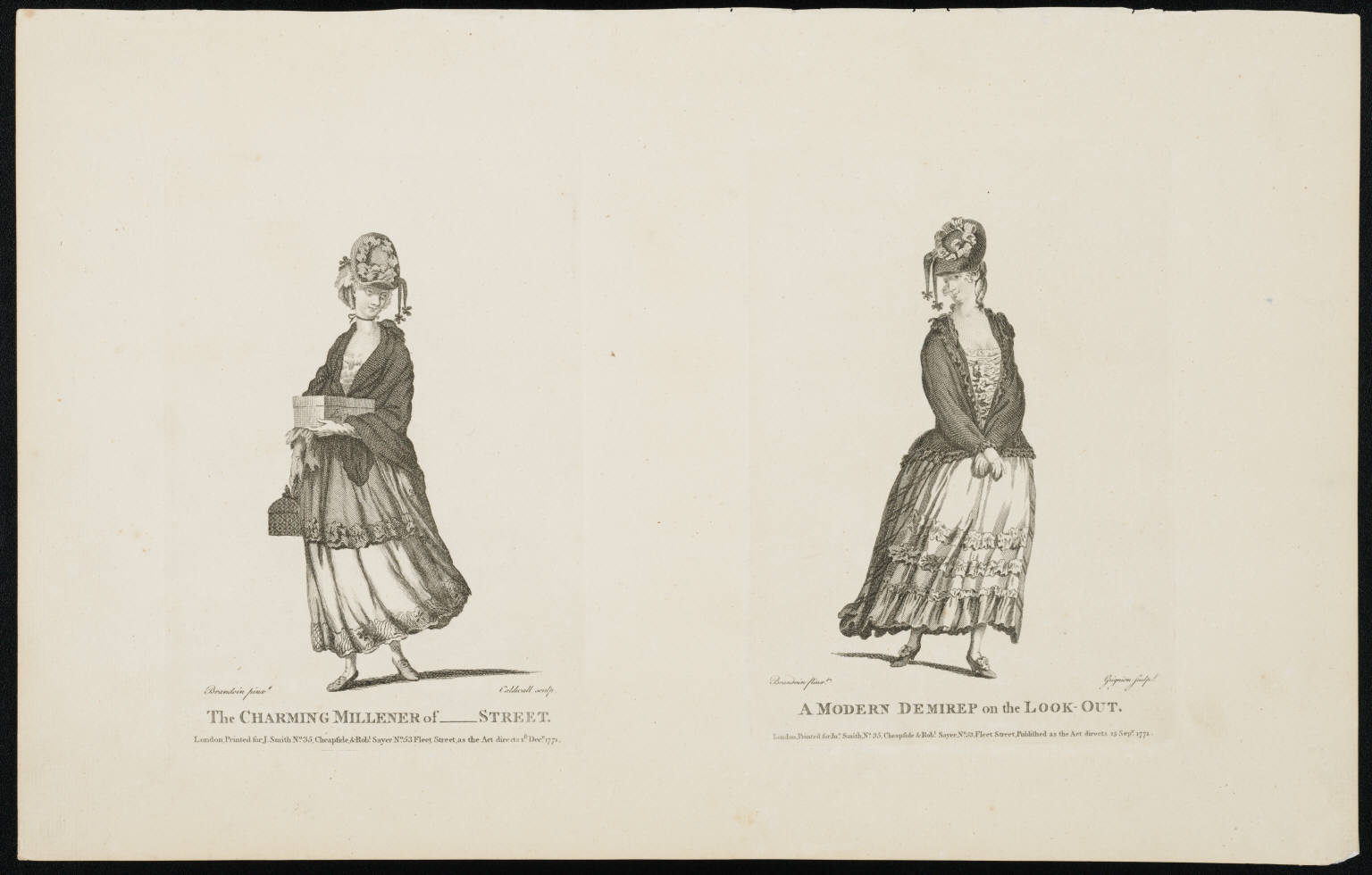
Courtesy of Lewis Walpole Library lwlpr03150

The London Tradesman actually warned young women against going into the millinery trade: "The vast Resort of young Beaus and Rakes to Milliners' Shops exposes young creatures to many Temptations, and insensibly debauches their Morals before they are capable of Vice...Nine out of ten young Creatures that are obligated to serve in these shops are ruined and undone: Take a Survey of all common Women of the Town, who take their Walks between Charing-Cross and Fleet-Ditch and, I am persuaded, more than half of them have been bred milliners, have been debauched in their Houses, and are obliged to throw themselves upon the Town for want of Bread, after they have left them. Whether it is owing to the Milliners, or to the Nature of the business, or to whatever cause is owing, the Facts are clear, and the Misfortunes attending the Apprenticeship so manifest...it ought to be the last shift a young Creature is driven to."

This and other period criticisms as well as the prevalence of satirical prints have led some historians to believe that milliners were not respected and thought to be nothing less than prostitutes. Other historians have looked more closely at the trade and women's roles in the eighteenth century and believe that milliners were actually highly respected.

Work by Amy Erickson and Jessica Collins with the records of the Clockmakers' and Clothworkers' companies show that the girls apprenticed to milliners came from mainly middling class families - their fathers were clergyman, apothecaries, goldsmiths, clerks, shopkeepers, and other similar trades and occupations. By contrast, the fathers of most of the boys apprenticed in the Clockmakers' company were from lower-status trades. With premiums to apprentice a girl to a milliner higher than those paid in general for boys, it is unlikely that parents would have paid to put their daughters into an occupation that was so associated with prostitution. Jessica Collins also notes that of the seventeen milliners operating through the Clothworkers' Company, most were based in the more prominent areas of London further demonstrating that the millinery trade was prestigious.

While The London Tradesman may have warned against milliners, in the same year A General Description of All Trades called millinery 'a considerable trade" and in 1761, the Parents and Guardians Directory noted that "A milliner, in good business, will not take a girl with less than £40 or £50.' An apprenticeship to a clockmaker, he thought, required a premium of £10 to £40. Furthermore, this same directory suggested the costs to set up a millinery would require £400 to £500, while it might take only £100-£200 to set up a clockmakers' shop. These were not inconsiderable sums at this time.

Some critics thought milliners encouraged vanity and excessive vanity among their customers but others believed that female milliners preserved female modesty by allowing them to be dressed by other women rather than male tailors. Additionally, rather than encouraging prostitution, it was thought to be a way for poor women to avoid prostitution.

In the eighteenth century, millinery was considered a respectable trade for middle-class women and impoverished upper-class women - women who would not want to lower themselves by becoming domestic servants or performing actual labor. Far from putting their daughters in trade because they were unmarriable, Amy Erickson suggests that parents apprenticed their daughters to provide them with a reasonable living when the family did not have the money for a dowry and also to gain skills that might attract a husband and sustain them throughout their lives. Mary and Ann Hogarth, sisters of the artist William Hogarth, contemporaries of Mosley, never married and supported themselves through their own millinery shop. One of their business cards was designed by their brother.

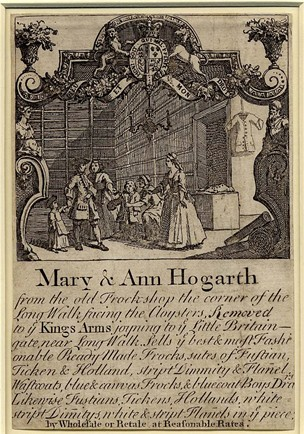
Mary and Ann Hogarth trade card

To be a successful milliner required not just being a skilled crafts-person, but a sense of style and a head for business. Eleanor Mosley's own life and career serve as a case in point as to the respectability of the trade. She came from a respectable middle class family, served her apprenticeship, and became a member of a trade guild in her own right. Her business was located in a high-end area of London, which she successfully ran for at least fifteen years. Other well-to-do tradesmen paid high premiums to apprentice their daughters to her.

Taken together, the evidence shows that millinery was an acceptable and respectable trade with high expectations that it would provide for a woman, whether single or married, for her entire life.

== Bibliography ==
- Barker, Hannah. The Business of Women. Oxford: Oxford University Press, 2006.
- Campbell, Kimberly Chrisman. The Face of Fashion: Milliners in Eighteenth-Century Visual Culture. Journal for Eighteenth-Century Studies 25, no. 2 (2002): 157–171.
- Dyer, Serena. Shopping, spectacle and senses. History Today, March 2015: 29–36.
- Erickson, Amy Louise. Clockmakers, Milliners, and Mistresses: Women Trading in the City of London Companies 1700-1750. n.d.
- Erickson, Amy Louise. Eleanor Mosley and Other Milliners in the City of London Companies 1700-1750. History Workshop Journal (Oxford University Press) 71, no. 1 (2011): 147–173.
- Erickson, Amy Louise. Married Women's occupations in eighteenth-century London. Continuity and Change (Cambridge University Press) 23, no. 02 (2008): 267–307.
- Hopkins, Susie. Milliners. In The Berg Companion to Fashion, by Valerie Steele, 508–512. New York: Berg, 2010.
- Collins, Jessica. "Jane Holt, Milliner, and Other Women in Business: Apprentices, Freewomen, and Mistresses in the Clothworkers' Company, 1606–1800". Textile History 44, no. 1 (May 2013): 72–94.
- Phillips, Nicola. Women in business 1700-1850. Woodbridge, Suffolk: Boydell Press, 2006.
- Sewell, Dennita. Mantua. In The Berg Companion to Fashion, by Valerie Steele, 496–497. New York: Berg, 2010.
