= Thaddeus Mosley =

American sculptor (1926–2026)

- Born: July 23, 1926; New Castle, Pennsylvania, U.S.
- Died: March 6, 2026 (aged 99); Pittsburgh, Pennsylvania, U.S.
- Education: BA, University of Pittsburgh, Pittsburgh
- Known for: Sculpture
- Awards: Governor's Award for Artist of the Year Pennsylvania Visual Arts (1999), PCA Cultural Award (2000), PCA Service to the Arts Award (2002)

Thaddeus Gilmore Mosley (July 23, 1926 – March 6, 2026) was an American sculptor who worked mostly in wood and was based in Pittsburgh, Pennsylvania.

== Life and career ==
Thaddeus Gilmore Mosley was born on July 23, 1926, in New Castle, Pennsylvania, the second youngest of five children and the only boy. Both sides of his family were farmers and miners. After high school graduation, he "entered as support company in California supplying Liberty ships" for the U.S. Navy. He was stationed on Peleliu Island in the western Pacific. With his ex-serviceman's grant he attended the University of Pittsburgh, where he earned his Bachelor of Arts with a double major in English and Journalism in 1950. While in college, he worked for photographer Isadore Frichman and the Pittsburgh Photo Guild, developing negatives in the darkroom a few hours each week. His interest in the visual arts was further piqued through a course titled "World Cultures," where he learned about different African art traditions and European modernist artists such as Constantin Brâncuși.

He met his first wife, Ruth Ray, in 1960 at a dance and the two were married after his first year of college but later separated. They had three children together. They settled in Pittsburgh and he took a job with the U.S. Postal Service after graduation. He also worked as a freelance journalist and photographer in the 1950s for the Pittsburgh Courier and various national magazines such as Ebony, Sepia, and Jet. Articles he wrote on jazz musicians and athletes would later serve as inspiration for his carving and sculpture.

Mosley became interested in pursuing sculpture through his frequent visits to the Carnegie Museum of Art and through his own art historical research at public libraries. He "was inspired to take up wood carving" after viewing a Scandinavian furniture display at a local department in the late 1950s. The display included wood carvings of birds and fish. Rather than paying $75 apiece for the animals, Mosley decided to make his own. This was the beginning of his lifelong passion for wood carving and his participation and activism in the Pittsburgh art scene, which would continue for the rest of his life.

Mosley maintained close friendships with fellow African-American sculptors William Palmer, a wood carver, and Carl "Bat" Smith; with whom he exchanged ideas, gathered logs for carving, and visited museums and jazz clubs in Pittsburgh's Hill District. In 1961, along with African-American artists Charles Anderson and Lee Cowan, Mosely founded the Watt Lane Art Club. The three saw the club as the start of grassroots movement to establish a supported African-American art scene in Pittsburgh, and other artists soon joined. The club expanded to over 20 members, changed their name to Group One, and ran a community gallery in the Manchester neighborhood until their disbandment in 1964. The name Group One was likely a reference to the more established Pittsburgh art collective called Group A (previously known as The Abstract Group), of which Mosley was also a member.

In 1964, he remarried to Yvonne Reed, by whom he would later have three children. The two moved to the Southside of Pittsburgh so he could have more studio space. He became well known to the general public in Pittsburgh after a local news channel, WQED, aired a special on the artist highlighting his studio. In the years that followed, he continued to work for the U.S. Postal Service and exhibit his sculpture locally. In 1968, "he was invited to have a one man exhibition at the Carnegie Museum of Art," which earned him national recognition. He continually advocated for the African-American art community in Pittsburgh, including as an officer of the Pittsburgh Society of Sculptors and a board member for the August Wilson Center for African American Culture.

Mosley died in Pittsburgh on March 6, 2026, at the age of 99.

== Exhibitions and awards ==
Major exhibitions include the Pittsburgh Center for the Arts (PCA)'s Artist of the Year show in 1979, the Three Rivers Arts Festival with Selma Burke in 1990, and the Manchester Craftsmen's Guild in 1995. He also is 1 of 32 artists to be featured in the 2018 Carnegie International.

Mosley's awards include the 1999 Governor's Award for Artist of the Year in Pennsylvania Visual Arts, the PCA 2000 Cultural Award, and the PCA 2002 Service to the Arts Award and Exhibition. The latter award, first awarded in 1997, is given to a member of the local arts community for demonstrating inspiration, involvement, commitment and passion for the arts. The Pittsburgh Tribune-Review called Mosley "a fixture at local art openings" and said:

A constant contributor to charity auctions (he recently donated two pieces to the Sharry Evrett Scholarship Award auction and created a penguin for Sweetwater Center for the Arts' Penguins on Parade auction), he also is widely respected as an instructor, having given countless workshops on woodcarving at colleges and art centers locally and regionally. Most notable has been the Touchstone Center for Crafts in Farmington, Fayette County, where he has taught wood sculpture every summer for more than 20 years.

A 45-minute documentary on Mosley's life, Thaddeus Mosley: Sculptor, was completed in 2012.

In October 2022, Mosley's sculptures were part of the inaugural edition of Paris + par Art Basel. Curated by Annabelle Ténèze, Director of Les Abattoirs, Thaddeus Mosley in La Suite de l’Histoire was exhibited at Musée National Eugène-Delacroix.

In 2023, Mosley had several solo exhibitions including Thaddeus Mosley: Recent Sculpture at Karma Los Angeles and Thaddeus Mosley: Forest at the Nasher Sculpture Center. Forest was organized by the Baltimore Museum of Art where it was exhibited between October 17, 2021, and March 27, 2022, and curated by Jessica Bell Brown. The exhibition included five recent sculptures, carved from discarded walnut trees the artist gathered in Pittsburgh neighborhoods.

== Work and influences ==
His best-known sculptures in Pittsburgh are the 14-foot cedars Phoenix at the corner of Centre Avenue and Dinwiddie in the Hill District and the Mountaintop limestone at the Martin Luther King Jr. Library in the Hill District at Herron and Milwaukee Streets. Other commissions include Three Rivers Bench in 2003 for the David L. Lawrence Convention Center; Legends at the Susquehanna Art Museum in Harrisburg, Pennsylvania, from December 2003 to March 2004; and an exhibition at the CUE Art Foundation Gallery in New York City in March 2004.

Another well known work titled Georgia Gate, created in 1975 and owned by the Carnegie Museum of Art, was based on sculptures from a graveyard in Sumner, Georgia that Mosley saw pictures of in Marshall Stearns' book The Story of Jazz. Living in Pittsburgh, Mosley met many influential musicians such as Miles Davis, John Coltrane, and Tommy Turrentine, the latter of whom was a good friend. The influence of jazz music can be seen in his improvisational carving techniques and the titles of sculptures, such as Tatum Scales. Made in 2020, the title and ridged elements "likely refers to Art Tatum, whose rapid-fire prowess on the piano was characterized by virtuoso traversals up and down the keyboard." Other artistic influences include Isamu Noguchi, whom Mosley considers one of the "greatest American sculptors" and African art, with particular interest in the diversity of Western and Central African art traditions.
