= The Jetty =

The Jetty could refer to:

- La Jetée, a 1962 science-fiction film
- The Jetty (TV series), a 2024 UK television series
