= Zoe Brough =

English actress

- Born: Zoe Anne V. Brough; 10 February 2003 (age 23); Slough, England
- Years active: 2014–present

Zoe Anne V. Brough (born 10 February 2003) is an English actress. She began her career as a child actress on stage, receiving a Laurence Olivier Award nomination for her performance in The Nether (2014). On television, she is known for her role as Jessica Mitford in the UKTV series Outrageous (2025).

== Early life ==
Brough was born in Slough, Berkshire. She attended the Arts Educational School's (ArtsEd) day school in West London.

== Career ==
At ten years old, Brough made her professional stage debut in the 2014 production of The Nether at London's Royal Court Theatre in the role of Iris, which she shared with Isabella Pappas, Jaime Adler and Perdita Hibbins. The production moved to the Duke of York's Theatre on the West End in 2015. Brough, Pappas, Adler and Hibbins were jointly nominated for Best Supporting Actress at the 2015 Laurence Olivier Awards for their performances. This was followed by roles as Blousey in Bugsy Malone (2015) at the Lyric Hammersmith, which she alternated with Eleanor Worthington Cox and Thea Lamb, and Lily in Harry Potter and the Cursed Child (2016) at the Palace Theatre.

Brough was cast as Diane in The Still Room at the Park Theatre in February 2020. Due to the COVID-19 pandemic, the production was rescheduled to run in 2022. Also that year, Brough made her television debut when she took over the role of Natalia Malinovsky in the BBC One medical soap opera Casualty from Lollie McKenzie.

In 2025, Brough starred as Nell Gwyn in Playhouse Creatures at the Orange Tree Theatre in Richmond. For her performance, she was nominated for Emerging Talent at the London Standard Theatre Awards. She made a guest appearance in an episode of Father Brown. Brough portrayed Jessica Mitford in the UKTV historical drama Outrageous, which premiered in June 2025.

== Filmography ==
Year	Title	Role	Notes
2020	Porcelain	Child	Short film
2022–present	Casualty	Natalia Malinovsky	Recurring role
2025	Father Brown	Marianne Gellert	1 episode
2025	Outrageous	Jessica Mitford	Main cast: 6 episodes

== Stage ==
Year	Title	Role	Notes
2014	The Nether	Iris	Royal Court Theatre, London
2015	Bugsy Malone	Blousey	Lyric Theatre, Hammersmith
2016	The Cursed Child	Young Lily	Palace Theatre, London
2022	The Still Room	Diane	Park Theatre, London
2025	Playhouse Creatures	Nell Gwyn	Orange Tree Theatre, Richmond
2026	The Rivals	Lydia Languish	Orange Tree Theatre, Richmond

== Awards and nominations ==
Year	Award	Category	Work	Result	Ref.
2015	Laurence Olivier Awards	Best Actress in a Supporting Role	The Nether	Nominated	(Note: With Isabella Pappas, Jamie Adler, Perdita Hibbins.)
2026	London Standard Theatre Awards	Emerging Talent	Playhouse Creatures	Nominated	
