= Isabella Pappas =

British-Italian actress

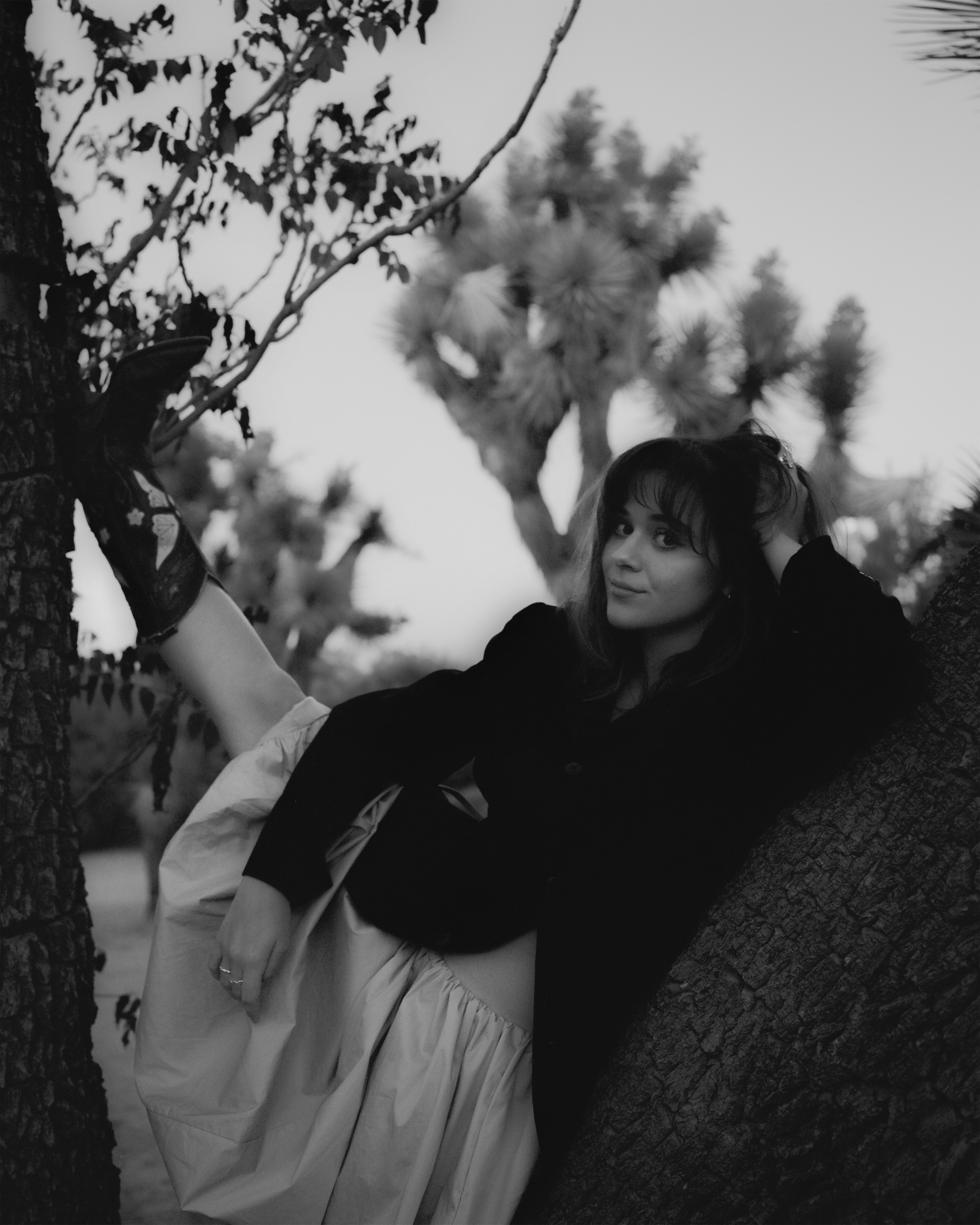
- Pappas in 2022
- Born: Isabella Noemi Pappas; 21 August 2002 (age 24); Italy
- Occupation: Actress
- Years active: 2012–present

Isabella Noemi Pappas (born 21 August 2002) is an actress and singer based in London. She began her career on the London stage, earning nominations for the Laurence Olivier Award and WhatsOnStage Award. On television, she is known for her roles in the ITV series Finding Alice (2021) and the Disney Channel series The Villains of Valley View (2022–23).

== Early life and education ==
Pappas was born in northern Italy and spent her early childhood on a farm. Her father is a pilot, and her mother is an American autism specialist. She also has French and Greek heritage. Pappas attended an international school and lived in Japan for two years for her mother's work.

The family settled in Chiswick, West London when Pappas was 11. She attended Sylvia Young Theatre School and later Arts Educational School (ArtsEd) for sixth form, studying Drama and English Literature. She also took classes at the British Theatre Academy and participated in Michael Xavier's MX Masterclass.

== Career ==
Upon moving to the city at 11 years old, Pappas made her London stage debut in the 2014 production of The Nether at the Royal Court Theatre in the role of Iris, which she shared with Zoe Brough. The production moved to the Duke of York's Theatre on the West End in 2015. Pappas, Brough, Jaime Adler, and Perdita Hibbins were jointly nominated for Best Supporting Actress at the 2015 Laurence Olivier Awards for their performances.

Pappas then starred as the titular Annie! on the show's 2015 tour around the UK. She made her television debut as Sarah Waingrow in the 2016 ITV crime drama miniseries Paranoid. She played Nina in the Stockwell Playhouse production of In the Heights in 2017. This was followed in 2018 by roles in 13 at Porthcurno's Minack Theatre, the Theatre Royal Stratford East's Terror at The Sweetshop, and Bring It On: The Musical at Southwark Playhouse.

For her performance as Cassidy Kramer-Lafayette in the 2019 run of the play Appropriate at the Donmar Warehouse, Pappas was nominated for the WhatsOnStage Award for Best Supporting Actress in a Play. She returned to television with guest appearances in the CBBC musical Almost Never in 2019 and the Channel 4 comedy-drama Home in 2020.

Pappas landed her first main television role as Charlotte Walsh, the daughter of Keeley Hawes' titular character, in the 2021 ITV comedy-drama Finding Alice.

She was then cast in a Disney pilot (working titles included Amy from Amarillo and Meet the Mayhems), which became The Villains of Valley View and premiered in 2022 on Disney Channel and Disney+.

In 2023, Pappas was cast as Joyce Maldonado (later Byers) in the Stranger Things prequel stage play Stranger Things: The First Shadow, which premiered on 17 November 2023 at the Phoenix Theatre in London. Pappas also played the first victim of Jimmy Savile in an episode of the BBC One miniseries The Reckoning. She has a role in the upcoming film Beach Boys.

== Personal life ==
Pappas became a British citizen in 2023.

== Acting credits ==
=== Film and television ===
Year	Title	Role	Notes
2016	Paranoid	Sadie Waingrow	Miniseries; 2 episodes
2017	Horizon Zero Dawn	Young Nora	Video game; voice role
2019	Almost Never	Rosie	Episode: "The Single"
2020	Home	Gemma	1 episode
2021	Finding Alice	Charlotte Walsh	Main role
2022–23	The Villains of Valley View	Amy Madden/ Havoc	Main role
2023	The Reckoning	Girl	1 episode
2027	Neuromancer	Mitchell	Post-production
TBA	Beach Boys	TBA	Film

=== Theatre ===
Year	Title	Role	Notes
2012	Le Nozze di Figaro	Ensemble	
2014–2015	The Nether	Iris	Duke of York's Theatre and Royal Court Theatre, London
2015	Annie!	Annie	UK tour
2017	In the Heights	Nina	Stockwell Playhouse, London
2018	13	Lucy	Minack Theatre, Porthcurno
2018	Terror at The Sweetshop	Emma	Theatre Royal Stratford East, London
2018	Bring It On: The Musical	Skylar	Southwark Playhouse, London
2019	Appropriate	Cassidy Kramer-Lafayette	Donmar Warehouse, London
2022	Instructions for a Teenage Armageddon	Ella	Southwark Playhouse, London
2023	Stranger Things: The First Shadow	Joyce Maldonado	Phoenix Theatre, London

== Awards and nominations ==
Year	Award	Category	Work	Result	Ref.
2015	Laurence Olivier Awards	Best Actress in a Supporting Role	The Nether (with Jamie Adler, Zoe Brough, Perdita Hibbins)	Nominated	
2020	WhatsOnStage Awards	Best Supporting Actress in a Play	Appropriate	Nominated	

== See also ==
- List of British actors
