= Outrageous (TV series) =

British television series

- Genre: Historical drama
- Based on: The Mitford Girls by Mary S. Lovell
- Screenplay by: Sarah Williams
- Directed by: Joss Agnew; Ellie Heydon
- Starring: Bessie Carter; Isobel Jesper Jones; James Purefoy; Anna Chancellor; Joanna Vanderham; Shannon Watson; Zoe Brough; Orla Hill; Robert Dawes
- Music by: Sami Goldberg
- Country of origin: United Kingdom
- Original language: English
- No. of series: 1
- No. of episodes: 6

Production
- Executive producers: Elizabeth Kilgarriff; Matthew Mosley; Craig Holleworth; Helen Perry; Robert Schildhouse; Jess O’Riordan; Stephen Nye
- Producer: Natasha Romaniuk
- Editors: Michael Harrowes; David Fisher; Nick Ames
- Production company: Firebird Pictures

Original release
- Network: BritBox (United States); U&Drama / BBC One (United Kingdom)
- Release: 19 June – 23 July 2025

Outrageous is a British historical drama television series about the Mitford sisters. The series premiered on 19 June 2025 on BritBox in the United States and on U&Drama in the United Kingdom.

== Premise ==
Based on the story of the Mitford sisters, six sisters who refused to play by the rules and whose often-scandalous lives made headlines around the world. Set in the 1930s, it is a tale of betrayal, scandal, heartache and even imprisonment.

== Cast and characters ==
- Bessie Carter as Nancy Mitford, the eldest Mitford sister
- Isobel Jesper Jones as Pamela Mitford
- Joanna Vanderham as Diana Mitford
- Shannon Watson as Unity Mitford
- Zoe Brough as Jessica Mitford
- Orla Hill as Deborah Mitford, the youngest Mitford sister
- Toby Regbo as Tom Mitford, the sisters’ only brother
- Anna Chancellor as Sydney Bowles, the siblings’ mother, known to them as ‘Muv’
- James Purefoy as David Freeman-Mitford, the siblings’ father, known to them as ‘Farve’
- Joshua Sasse as Oswald Mosley
- Jamie Blackley as Peter Rodd
- James Musgrave as Hamish Erskine
- Calam Lynch as Bryan Guinness
- Will Attenborough as Joss
- Jack Michael Stacey as Derek Jackson
- Joseph Potter as Esmond Romilly
- Robert Daws as Winston Churchill

== Episodes ==
No.	Title	Directed by	Written by	Original release date
1	"The Gathering Storm"	Joss Agnew	Sarah Williams	18 June 2025
2	"Girl on the Rebound"	Joss Agnew	Sarah Williams	18 June 2025
3	"Sparks Light Fires"	Joss Agnew	Sarah Williams	25 June 2025
4	"Hating and Loving"	Ellie Heydon	Sarah Williams	9 July 2025
5	"Oysters and Champagne"	Ellie Heydon	Sarah Williams	16 July 2025
6	"Point of No Return"	Ellie Heydon	Sarah Williams	23 July 2025

== Production ==
The series, written by Sarah Williams and based on the Mary S. Lovell biography The Mitford Girls (titled The Sisters in the USA), is produced by Firebird Pictures. Directors for the series are Joss Agnew and Ellie Heydon with Natasha Romaniuk as series producer. The executive producers are Elizabeth Kilgarriff, Matthew Mosley and Craig Holleworth as well as Helen Perry for UKTV and Robert Schildhouse Jess O’Riordan and Stephen Nye for BritBox.

Matthew Mosley, executive producer and head of development at Firebird Pictures, is the great-grandson of Oswald Mosley—played by Joshua Sasse in the series—through his first wife Cynthia. He described seeing Sasse in character as his great-grandfather on set for the first time as "quite surreal."

The cast includes Bessie Carter, Orla Hill, Joanna Vanderham, Isobel Jesper Jones, Shannon Watson and Zoe Brough as the Mitford Sisters with Anna Chancellor and James Purefoy cast as their parents.

Filming was underway in June 2024 across the UK including St Mary the Virgin's Church, Aylesbury, Buckinghamshire and Tring Park Mansion, Hertfordshire. First look images from filming were released in August 2024.

== Broadcast ==
In the US, the series premiered on 19 June 2025 on BritBox, while in the UK it premiered on U&Drama, and later aired on BBC One and BBC iPlayer on 14 June 2026.

== Reception ==
The review aggregator website Rotten Tomatoes reported an 88% approval rating based on 25 critic reviews. The website's critics consensus reads, "Dramatizing one of Britain's most controversial families with slick presentation and superb acting, Outrageous is an engaging glimpse into the corrosive lure of fascism." Metacritic, which uses a weighted average, gave a score of 74 out of 100 based on 7 critics, indicating "generally favorable".
