= The Woods (TV series) =

Upcoming British television series

- Genre: Crime drama; Mystery; Thriller
- Based on: The Woods by Harlan Coben
- Written by: Danny Brocklehurst; Charlotte Coben; Tom Farrelly; Joe Forrest
- Directed by: Andy De Emmony; Claire Tailyour; Isher Sahota
- Starring: Tom Bateman; Michelle Keegan; Pearce Quigley; Mandeep Dhillon
- Country of origin: United Kingdom
- Original language: English

Production
- Executive producers: Danny Brocklehurst; Harlan Coben; Nicola Shindler; Richard Fee; Charlotte Coben
- Producer: Will McDonough
- Production companies: Final Twist Productions; Quay Street Productions

Original release
- Network: Netflix

The Woods is an upcoming British mystery thriller television series, based on the 2007 novel of the same name by Harlan Coben, adapted by Danny Brocklehurst and starring Tom Bateman, Michelle Keegan, Mandeep Dhillon and Pearce Quigley. It is set to be released on Netflix.

== Premise ==
A barrister becomes convinced his sister may still be alive, twenty years after her supposed death.

== Cast ==
- Tom Bateman as Paul ‘Cope’ Copeland
- Michelle Keegan as Lucy Silverfield
- Mandeep Dhillon as Loren Muse
- Pearce Quigley as Ira Silverfield
- Rade Sherbedgia as Uncle Sosh
- James Buckley as Lonnie Berger
- Shannon Watson as Shannon Johnson
- Pamela Nomvete as Mrs. Peters
- Kerry Howard as Greta
- Roger Barclay as EJ Jenrette
- Simon Lowe as Bob Cole
- Dean Fagan as DS Steve York
- Tom Allen as Flynn Hickory
- Tracy-Ann Oberman as Jessica Kinberg
- Charlotte Beaumont as DC Daisy Dillon
- Christopher Harper as Wayne Steubens

== Production ==
=== Development ===
The English-language series was announced by Netflix in April 2026. It is based on the 2007 novel of the same name by Harlan Coben, which was previously adapted into a Polish-language series for Netflix in 2020. The novel is adapted by Danny Brocklehurst with Charlotte Coben, Tom Farrelly and Joe Forrest. Harlan Coben is an executive producer through his company Final Twist Productions, in partnership with Quay Street Productions. Brocklehurst is also an executive producer alongside Charlotte Coben, Nicola Shindler and Richard Fee. Will McDonagh is series producer with episodes directed by Andy De Emmony, Isher Sahota and Claire Tailyour.

=== Casting ===
The cast is led by Tom Bateman and Michelle Keegan with the cast also including Mandeep Dhillon and Pearce Quigley, Shannon Watson, James Buckley, Tom Allen, Kerry Howard, Rade Sherbedgia,Tracy-Ann Oberman and Charlotte Beaumont.

=== Filming ===
Filming took place in England and Wales from May 2026, with filming locations including Bolton, Manchester, Knutsford, Liverpool and Birkenhead in England, and Denbighshire in Wales. First-look images from filming were released to the media in May 2026. Filming was completed by October 2026.
