= Shannon Watson =

English actress

- Born: Shannon Ashleigh Watson
- Education: Royal Conservatoire of Scotland
- Years active: 2024–present

Shannon Ashleigh Watson is an English actress. On television, she is best known for her role in the UKTV series Outrageous (2025). She also appeared in BBC One crime drama The Jetty (2024).

== Early life ==
Watson is from the Isle of Wight. She attended Ryde Academy. After completing school, Watson relocated to Milton Keynes with her mother and then studied international relations at university. Upon deciding to pursue acting, she trained at the Royal Conservatoire of Scotland, graduating in 2023. She was awarded the Spotlight Prize honouring graduates that year.

== Career ==
In 2024, Watson starred as Pauline in a stage adaptation of The Girls of Slender Means at the Royal Lyceum Theatre and made her television debut with a recurring role as Miranda Ashby in 2024 BBC One crime drama The Jetty starring Jenna Coleman. She also appeared in an episode of the FX on Hulu and Disney+ Northern Ireland historical drama Say Nothing.

Watson portrays the controversial figure Unity Mitford in the 2025 UKTV historical drama Outrageous, based on the Mitford family. In 2026, she was cast in Harlan Coben mystery thriller adaptation The Woods for Netflix.

== Filmography ==
Key
†	Denotes works that have not yet been released

Year	Title	Role	Notes
2024	The Jetty	Miranda Ashby	4 episodes
2025	Say Nothing	Make-up Artist	1 episode
2025	Outrageous	Unity Mitford	Main cast: 6 episodes
