= Orla Hill =

English actress

- Born: Orla Maureen Fitzsimons Hill; 9 May 2002 (age 24); Homerton, London, England
- Education: Emmanuel College, Cambridge
- Occupation: Actor
- Years active: 2012–present

Orla Maureen Fitzsimons Hill (born 9 May 2002) is an English actress. She began her career as a child actor in the films Song for Marion (2012) and Swallows and Amazons (2016) and the CBBC series Hetty Feather (2017–2019). More recently, she is known for her role in the UKTV series Outrageous (2025).

== Early life ==
Hill was born at Homerton Hospital, East London to parents Dave Hill, a London journalist, and Sheila Fitzsimons, who worked as a journalist and the Director of Transformation at The Guardian, and grew up in the Lower Clapton area with her two sisters and three brothers. Her maternal grandparents are Irish; her grandmother was born in Cootehill, County Cavan before moving to Glasgow and then London.

From the age of 8, Hill took classes at the Anna Fiorentini Theatre and Film School. She attended Millfields Community Primary School and then Mossbourne Community Academy. In 2025, she will graduate from Emmanuel College, Cambridge with a Master of Engineering (MEng). She is a researcher at Cambridge's Centre for Climate Repair.

== Career ==
Hill began her career as a child actress, making her feature film debut at age 10 as Jennifer in the 2012 comedy-drama Song for Marion. This was followed by a role as Susan Walker in the 2016 family adventure film Swallows and Amazons. The next year, Hill made her television debut when she joined the cast of the CBBC adaptation of Hetty Feather for its third series as Emily Calendar. She would reprise her role as Emily in Hetty Feather's fourth series. She also played Jennifer in the 2019 ITV true crime miniseries A Confession.

In 2023, Hill appeared in the ITVX 3-part miniseries Stonehouse as the titular character's (Matthew Macfadyen) daughter Jane Stonehouse. She had a recurring role as Ruby Foxcroft in the 2024 BBC Three adaptation of A Good Girl's Guide to Murder. Announced in 2024, she portrayed Deborah Mitford in the 2025 UKTV historical drama Outrageous.

== Filmography ==
=== Film ===
Year	Title	Role	Notes
2012	Song for Marion	Jennifer	Also known as Unfinished Song
2013	Get Me to the Church On Time	Little Leanne	Short film
2014	Lily and the Revolution	Lily	Short film
2016	Swallows and Amazons	Susan Walker	

=== Television ===
Year	Title	Role	Notes
2017–2019	Hetty Feather	Emily Calendar	12 episodes
2019	Holby City	May Gledhill	Episode: "Circle of Life"
2019	A Confession	Jennifer Fulcher	Miniseries, 4 episodes
2023	Stonehouse	Jane Stonehouse	Miniseries, 3 episodes
2024	A Good Girl's Guide to Murder	Ruby Foxcroft	3 episodes
2025	Outrageous	Deborah Mitford	Main cast: 6 episodes
