= Song for Marion =

2012 British-German film by Paul Andrew Williams

- Promotional poster
- Directed by: Paul Andrew Williams
- Written by: Paul Andrew Williams
- Produced by: Ken Marshall; Philip Moross
- Starring: Terence Stamp; Gemma Arterton; Christopher Eccleston; Vanessa Redgrave
- Cinematography: Carlos Catalán
- Edited by: Daniel Farrell
- Music by: Laura Rossi
- Production companies: Steel Mill Pictures; Coolmore Productions; Egoli Tossell Film; Film House Germany
- Distributed by: Entertainment One
- Release dates: 15 September 2012 (TIFF); 22 February 2013 (United Kingdom); 14 March 2013 (Germany)
- Running time: 93 minutes
- Countries: United Kingdom; Germany
- Language: English
- Box office: $9.2 million

Song for Marion is a 2012 British-German comedy-drama film written and directed by Paul Andrew Williams and starring Terence Stamp, Gemma Arterton, Christopher Eccleston and Vanessa Redgrave. The film was released as Unfinished Song in the USA.

The film was nominated for three awards—Best Actor, Best Screenplay, and Best Supporting Actress—at the 2012 British Independent Film Awards.

== Plot ==
Arthur Harris is the grumpy husband of Marion, who is terminally ill yet continues to participate with enthusiasm at her local seniors' choir, The OAP'Z. The choirmaster is a young teacher, Elizabeth who is preparing the choir to enter a local musical choir competition called "Shadow Song". Arthur is also estranged from his son, James. Marion's health deteriorates over time until one night when she dies in her sleep. Arthur initially takes this loss severely and cuts himself from his family and the choir. Eventually he agrees to take Marion's place in the choir. The transition proves to be a challenge for Arthur thanks to the unconventional songbook that includes racier songs such as Salt-N-Pepa's "Let's Talk About Sex" and Motörhead's "Ace of Spades". However he grows to enjoy spending time in the choir.

On the eve of the competition, Arthur has an argument with James in a failed attempt to rebuild their relationship and pulls out of the choir. The choir participates in the competition without Arthur. He arrives later but before he can perform with the choir, they are eliminated from the competition by the judges. The choir are on their way to return home in defeat when Arthur stops the bus and storms the musical competition's stage shortly joined by the rest of the choir. They perform again with Arthur singing a solo of "Lullabye (Goodnight, My Angel)". The choir finishes in third place and returns home triumphant. Arthur and his son, James (who watched him perform in the competition) reconnect on the journey home with James leaving an answering phone message confirming this later.

== Cast ==
- Terence Stamp as Arthur
- Vanessa Redgrave as Marion
- Gemma Arterton as Elizabeth
- Barry Martin as Timothy
- Taru Devani as Sujantha
- Anne Reid as Brenda
- Elizabeth Counsell as Cheryl
- Ram John Holder as Charlie
- Denise Rubens as Marge
- Arthur Nightingale as Terry
- Jumayn Hunter as Steven
- Christopher Eccleston as James
- Orla Hill as Jennifer
- Bill Thomas as Bill
- Willie Jonah as Robert
- Calita Rainford as Doctor
- Federay Holmes as Day Care Nurse
- Calum Sivyer as Heavy Metal Kid
- Alan Ruscoe as Judge
- Sally Ann Matthews as Playground Monitor
- Paul Andrew Williams as Delivery Guy
- Caroline Bartleet as Runner
- Brian Shelley as Choir Organiser
- Christopher Terry as Male Compere
- Melanie Cripps as Female Compere
- Stephen Quinnell as Spectator
- Dominic Kemp as Doctor
- Peter M. Quinn as Theatre Crowd
- Greg Forrester (uncredited)
- Jack Southern as Village Hall Crowd
- Jack Pearson as Theatre and Village Hall Crowd
- Daniel Hepplewhite as Village Hall Crowd

== Soundtrack ==
The film is accompanied by a song titled "Unfinished Songs" written by Diane Warren and performed by Celine Dion. The song was included in Dion's 2013 album Loved Me Back to Life but with different vocal and musical arrangements.

The song "Lullabye (Goodnight, My Angel)", performed by the main character in the film, is a Billy Joel song.

The score was composed by Laura Rossi. Lost in the Multiplex's Soundtrek section deemed Rossi's score "lovely", but opined that the OAP'Z songs "aren't particularly funny, they're not that fun to listen to either."

== Reception ==
On review aggregator Rotten Tomatoes, the film holds an approval rating of 65% based on 100 reviews, with an average rating of 5.91/10. The website's critics consensus reads: "It's unabashedly sentimental, but thanks to reliably powerful performances from a well-rounded veteran cast, Unfinished Song proves a sweetly compelling character piece." On Metacritic, the film has a weighted average score of 57 out of 100, based on 25 critics, indicating "mixed or average reviews".

== Production ==
Although the film is set in London it was primarily shot on location in Newcastle upon Tyne and Durham. Filming took place over some six weeks in July and August 2011, and locations included St Francis Community Centre (next to Freeman Hospital), Newcastle City Hall, Mill Volvo Tyne Theatre, Chester-le-Street Cemetery and Durham Johnston Comprehensive School.

The 2007 documentary film Young@Heart also deals with a choir of seniors performing contemporary music.
