= The Trial: A Murder in the Family =

- Genre: Docudrama legal drama
- Created by: Nick Holt
- Written by: Sarah Quintrell
- Directed by: Nick Holt; Kath Mattock
- Starring: Michael Gould; Emma Lowndes; Kevin Harvey; Fern Deacon; Farshid Rokey; Max Hill; Michelle Nelson; John Ryder; Lucy Organ
- Country of origin: United Kingdom
- Original language: English
- No. of series: 1
- No. of episodes: 5

Production
- Executive producers: Emma Loach; Jonathan Smith
- Producer: Andrew Litvin
- Editors: Ben Brown; Richard Graham
- Running time: 60 minutes
- Production company: Dragonfly

Original release
- Network: Channel 4
- Release: 21 May – 26 May 2017

The Trial: A Murder in the Family is a British television docudrama, produced by Dragonfly Film and television, that first broadcast on Channel 4 on 21 May 2017. The five-part series follows a fictional court case in which university lecturer Simon Davis (Michael Gould) is tried for the murder of his wife Carla, in an attempt to recreate an accurate portrayal of an English legal trial. Filming and recording of nearly all real court proceedings in England and Wales was prohibited, hence the trial presented cannot be a genuine case. However, the prosecuting counsel, defence counsel and judge featured in the series were real professionals; and the jury was made up of twelve members of the British public. The only actors featured were the defendant and other key witnesses.

The series was co-directed by Nick Holt, who won a BAFTA in 2013 for the Channel 4 documentary The Murder Trial, which followed a very similar format. Holt stated that the new format would "bring audiences closer than ever to those mechanics of a real murder trial." Fellow director Kath Mattock said that; "During rehearsals only three actors knew the truth and we tried to maintain that all the way through the trial. Concepts like 'truth' and 'story' are very subjective in a courtroom, so the trial had a natural fluidity within the confines of the legal process." Although the jury were aware that Davis was played by an actor, they were asked to treat the case as if it was a real trial, and only presented with the evidence as it was revealed in court.

Max Hill QC, who appears as the prosecuting barrister in this case, was appointed as the independent reviewer for terrorism laws in the UK shortly before the series was filmed. Davis' defence barrister, John Ryder QC, is notable for having played a crucial part in the trial of those suspected of the murder of Damilola Taylor.

== Cast ==
- Michael Gould as Simon Davis
- Emma Lowndes as Carla Davis
- Kevin Harvey as Lewis Skinner
- Fern Deacon as Catherine Davis
- Liam Sargeant as Oscar Davis
- Farshid Rokey as Danny Mullen
- Max Hill QC, Senior Prosecution Barrister
- Michelle Nelson, Junior Prosecution Barrister
- John Ryder QC, Senior Defence Barrister
- Lucy Organ, Junior Defence Barrister
- Brian Barker CBE QC, Crown Court Judge
- Corrine Bowler as Detective Constable No. 1
- Nina Tanner as Detective Constable No. 2

=== Jury ===
- Brendan Arndt; Mobile Product Manager
- Tim Hashemi; Student
- Simon Haywood; Security Officer
- James Katz; Barber
- Mark Maylam; Painter and Decorator
- Cherry Morrell; Office Manager
- Natalie Pickup; Teacher
- Martha Vickers; Retired Health Visitor
- Gemma Whitehouse; Hedge Fund Associate
- Christine Bruce-Reid; Housewife
- Lisa; Tax Inspector
- Daniel; Unknown
- Vabian kibet; nurse

== Episodes ==
No.	Title	Directed by	Written by	Original release date	Viewers (millions)
1	"Episode 1"	Nick Holt & Kath Mattock	Sarah Quintrell	21 May 2017	2.19
The jury are introduced to Simon Davis, accused of the murder of his estranged wife, Carla. Evidence given by a forensic examiner reveals that Carla was pregnant at the time of her death.
2	"Episode 2"	Nick Holt & Kath Mattock	Sarah Quintrell	22 May 2017	1.61
One of Carla's former work colleagues gives evidence, and Simon's ex-wife takes the stand to strengthen claims by the prosecution that he is capable of violence towards a sexual partner.
3	"Episode 3"	Nick Holt & Kath Mattock	Sarah Quintrell	23 May 2017	1.65
Carla's boyfriend, Lewis Skinner, gives evidence following claims that a former work colleague, Danny Mullen, spotted him in the area shortly before Carla's body was found.
4	"Episode 4"	Nick Holt & Kath Mattock	Sarah Quintrell	24 May 2017	1.48
The trial concludes with the final delivery of Simon's evidence, as the jury retire to begin deliberations.
5	"Episode 5"	Nick Holt & Kath Mattock	Sarah Quintrell	25 May 2017	1.49
After the jury cannot reach a verdict and a mistrial declared, the truth about how Simon murdered Carla Davis is revealed through flashbacks.
