= Hetty Feather (TV series) =

British television series

- Genre: Historical Drama
- Developed by: Helen Blakeman
- Directed by: Chloe Thomas; Paul Walker; Delyth Thomas; Reza Moradi
- Starring: Isabel Clifton; Dasharn Anderson; Polly Allen; Eva Pope; Gus Barry; Ava Merson-O'Brien; Eleanor Worthington Cox; Fern Deacon
- Theme music composer: Andy Price
- Composer: Andy Price
- Country of origin: United Kingdom
- Original language: English
- No. of series: 6
- No. of episodes: 55

Production
- Executive producers: Foz Allan (Series 1); Alison Davis (Series 2–6)
- Producer: David Collier
- Running time: 28 minutes
- Production company: CBBC

Original release
- Network: CBBC; CBBC HD
- Release: 11 May 2015 – 15 April 2020

Hetty Feather is a British children's drama series, based on the novel of the same name by Jacqueline Wilson. Set in the Victorian era, it focuses on the life of the title character who was abandoned as a baby, lives first in a Foundling Hospital in London, and later works as a maid for a rich family in their home. The first series aired on CBBC from 11 May 2015 to 6 July 2015. The series began airing in the United States on BYUtv in 2018. The show concluded with a three-part special in 2020, which served as the series' sixth and final season.

== Premise ==
The series revolves around Hetty Feather, who was abandoned as a baby at the Foundling Hospital. She and her foster brother Gideon Smeed were fostered for a while by Peg Cotton, but when they turned 5, they had to return to the Foundling Hospital.

The series is set during 1887 and filmed at Cobham Hall, Cobham, Kent and The Historic Dockyard Chatham with The Maidstone Studios as their production base for Series 2 and 3. During series 3, filming moved to Belmont House in Faversham, Kent to double as Calendar Hall, which features from Series 3 to 6.

== Characters ==
=== Key ===
† marks that the character is now deceased.

=== Main characters ===
Character	Actor	Duration	Series
Hetty Feather	Isabel Clifton	1x01–6x03	Series 1–6
Gideon Smeed	Dasharn Anderson	1x01–6x03	Series 1–6
Sheila Ormsby	Polly Allen	1x01–5x01, 5x09–6x03	Series 1–6
Matron Gertrude Bottomly	Eva Pope	1x01–3x10, 4x04, 5x11–5x12, 6x02–6x03	Series 1–6
Harriet Summers	Ava Merson-O'Brien	1x01–3x08, 6x01–6x03	Series 1–3, 6
Mathias Grigg	Gus Barry	1x01–3x08, 6x01–6x03	Series 1–3, 6
Donald Cranbourne	Matthew Ashforde	1x01–3x08, 6x02–6x03	Series 1–3, 6
Walter Brittle	Aaron Niles	1x01–3x08, 6x02–6x03	Series 1–3, 6
Ned Swann	David Knight	1x01–3x08, 6x02–6x03	Series 1–3, 6
Vince Rickard	Redmand Rance	1x01–3x08, 4x06, 6x02	Series 1–4, 6
Judd Mortimer	Joshua Langley	1x01–3x08, 6x02–6x03	Series 1–3, 6
Mary Crane/Emily Prestwick	Trixiebelle Harrowell	1x01–1x09	Series 1
Polly Renfrew	Eleanor Worthington Cox	1x01–2x02	Series 1–2
Monica Clackett †	Izzy Lee	1x01–2x06	Series 1–2
Elizabeth Flounder	Isabelle Allen	1x01–3x06	Series 1–3
Nurse Macclesfield	Susan McArdle	1x01–3x08, 6x02–6x03	Series 1–3, 6
Nurse Winterson/Mrs Clark	Rosalyn Wright	1x01–3x08, 6x03	Series 1–3, 6
Cook Jenkins	Wendi Peters	1x03, 2x01–2x02, 2x10–3x08	Series 1–3
Ida Battersea	Gemma Whelan	2x01–3x01, 3x05, 3x10	Series 2–3
Blanche Newbold	Blaise Allan	2x05–3x03	Series 2–3
Rosamund Calendar †	Georgina Strawson	3x07–6x01	Series 3–6
George Calendar	Mark Frost	3x07, 3x09–4x10, 5x12–6x03	Series 3–6
Mrs Penhaligon	Nina Wadia	3x09–3x10	Series 3
Agnes	Fern Deacon	3x09–6x03	Series 3–6
Jack	Stuart Campbell	3x09–5x12, 6x02	Series 3–6
Edwin Calendar	Hugo Cracknell	3x09–6x03	Series 3–6
Emily Calendar	Orla Hill	3x09–4x10	Series 3–4
Constance Calendar	Tabitha Byron	3x09–6x03	Series 3–6
Mrs Whittock	Kate Williams	4x01–4x07	Series 4
Lady Grenford	Georgie Glen	4x01–4x10, 5x03–6x03	Series 4–6
Mrs Brody	Rhea Bailey	4x01–4x10	Series 4
Lizzie	India Brown	4x03–6x03	Series 4–6
Robert Grenford	Ben Radcliffe	4x04, 4x07–4x08, 4x10	Series 4
Charles/Samuel Buscombe	Jack Wolfe	4x06–4x10	Series 4
Ashok	Jairaj Varsani	5x01–5x10	Series 5
Ambrose	Steve John Shepherd	5x02–5x10	Series 5
Flo	Rhianna Merralls	5x02–5x12	Series 5

=== Guest and recurring characters ===
Character	Actor	Duration	Series
Colonel Rupert Brigwell	Christopher Villiers	1x01–3x08, 4x04	Series 1–4
Arthur	Ewan Harris	1x01–1x04	Series 1
Jack	Eliot Carrington	1x01–1x04	Series 1
Young Hetty	Jocelyn MacNab	1x01–1x02, 1x05, 2x01	Series 1–2
Young Gideon	Jordan Anthony Nash	1x01–1x02, 1x05, 2x01	Series 1–2
Peg	Nicola Stuart-Hill	1x01–1x02, 1x05, 2x01	Series 1–2
Young Jem	Louis Healy	1x01–1x02, 1x05, 2x01	Series 1–2
Young Polly	Kitty Peterkin	1x01–1x02	Series 1
Doctor Mallory	Danny Horn	1x01–1x02	Series 1
Arthur Prestwick	Paul Buillion	1x08–1x09	Series 1
Hannah Prestwick	Sophia Di Martino	1x08–1x09	Series 1
Madame Adeline	Sukie Smith	1x09–1x10	Series 1
Jack Black	Jordan Coulson	1x03	Series 1
Jem	Ted Reilly	1x05, 2x03	Series 1–2
Jem	Joe Mason	1x05, 2x03	Series 1–2
Annie Bottomly	Jo-Anne Knowles	1x05	Series 1
Eliza	Lexie Benbow-Hart	1x05, 2x03–2x04	Series 1–2
Eliza	Isabelle Embleton	1x05, 2x03–2x04	Series 1–2
Mr Cooper	Michael Burgess	1x05	Series 1
Mr. Jacob Melrose	Bob Golding	1x06, 2x04	Series 1–2
Sgt. Cragg	David Kirkbride	1x07	Series 1
Charlie	Alfie Davis	1x07	Series 1
Lady Asquith	Helen Grace	1x08, 2x01, 2x07–2x10	Series 1–2
Lord Upton	Colin Hoult	1x09	Series 1
Charlotte Upton	Holly J. Barrett	1x09	Series 1
Floss Guppy	Sarah Rayson	Sx01	Special (2016)
Tyler Lewis	Miles Butler Hughton	Sx01	Special (2016)
Toni Trent	Nelly Currant	Sx01	Special (2016)
Billie Trent	Gwen Currant	Sx01	Special (2016)
May-Li Wang	Stacy Liu	Sx01	Special (2016)
Agnes Didcott	Sophia Capasso	2x01	Series 2
Baby Hazel	Darcey and Savannah Corbett	2x01	Series 2
Minister	Jonathan Cann	2x01	Series 2
Stan Pollard	McKell David	2x01–2x03–2x06	Series 2
Mr McCartney	Michael Higgs	2x02	Series 2
Mrs McCartney	Natasha Sparkes	2x02	Series 2
Clara	Jessie Mae Alonzo	2x03–2x04	Series 2
Rev Cranbourne	Pip Torrens	2x04	Series 2
Mr Overton	Simeon Willis	2x06	Series 2
Mr Sutton	Dan Tetsell	2x06	Series 2
Dr Kate Webster	Belinda Stewart-Wilson	2x07	Series 2
Collins	Paul Brown	2x07–2x09	Series 2
Mr Deerheart	Ajay Chhabra	2x09	Series 2
Sissy	Jemima Bennett	3x01–3x02	Series 3
Somerstown Porter	Daniel Hawksford	3x01	Series 3
Miss Sarah Smith	Ann Mitchell	3x01–3x05	Series 3
Kit	Tut Nyuot	3x01–3x02, 3x09–3x10	Series 3
Bobby	Wilson Radjou-Pujalte	3x01–3x02, 3x09–3x10	Series 3
Constable Clarke	Louis Tamone	3x01–3x08	Series 3
Mr Alf Brumsden	David Schaal	3x01–3x04, 3x07–3x10	Series 3
Lil	India Jazz	3x01–3x02	Series 3
Ludgate Porter	Nathan Clough	3x02	Series 3
Jess	Mercy Gaiger	3x02–3x03, 3x10	Series 3
Doctor Bridges	Adam Astill	3x05	Series 3
Annabelle Bridges	Amy Jayne	3x05	Series 3
Delivery Man	Matt Dineen	3x05	Series 3
Charlie	Wil Johnson	3x06	Series 3
William Calendar	Arlo River Rex Oluban Warner	4x01–6x01	Series 4–6
Mrs. Doughty	Chizzy Akudolu	5x11-5x12	Series 5

=== Timeline ===
Actor	Character	Series					
Actor	Character	1	2	3	4	5	6
Isabel Clifton	Hetty Feather	Main	Main	Main	Main	Main	Main
Darsharn Anderson	Gideon Smeed	Main	Main	Main	Main	Main	Main
Polly Allen	Sheila Ormsby	Main	Main	Main	Main	Main	Main
Eva Pope	Matron Gertrude Bottomly	Main	Main	Main	Guest	Recurring	Main
Ava Merson-O'Brien	Harriet Summers	Main	Main	Main	—N/a	—N/a	Main
Gus Barry	Mathias Grigg	Main	Main	Main	—N/a	—N/a	Main
Matthew Ashforde	Donald Cranbourne	Main	Main	Main	—N/a	—N/a	Guest
Aaron Niles	Walter Brittle	Main	Main	Main	—N/a	—N/a	Guest
David Knight	Ned Swann	Main	Main	Main	—N/a	—N/a	Guest
Redmand Rance	Vince Rickard	Main	Main	Main	Guest	—N/a	Guest
Joshua Langley	Judd Mortimer	Main	Main	Main	—N/a	—N/a	Guest
Trixiebelle Harrowell	Mary Crane	Main	—N/a	—N/a	—N/a	—N/a	—N/a
Eleanor Worthington Cox	Polly Renfrew	Main	Main	—N/a	—N/a	—N/a	—N/a
Izzy Lee	Monica Clackett	Main	Main	—N/a	—N/a	—N/a	—N/a
Isabelle Allen	Elizabeth Flounder	Main	Main	Main	—N/a	—N/a	—N/a
Susan McArdle	Nurse Macclesfield	Main	Main	Main	—N/a	—N/a	Guest
Rosalyn Wright	Nurse Winterson/Mrs Clark	Main	Main	Main	—N/a	—N/a	Guest
Christopher Villiers	Colonel Rupert Brigwell	Recurring	Recurring	Recurring	Guest	—N/a	—N/a
Wendi Peters	Cook Jenkins	Recurring	Recurring	Recurring	—N/a	—N/a	—N/a
Helen Grace	Lady Asquith	Recurring	Recurring	—N/a	—N/a	—N/a	—N/a
Gemma Whelan	Ida Battersea	—N/a	Main	Guest	—N/a	—N/a	—N/a
Blaise Allan	Blanche Newbold	—N/a	Main	Main	—N/a	—N/a	—N/a
Georgina Strawson	Rosamund Calendar	—N/a	—N/a	Main	Main	Main	Main
Mark Frost	George Calendar	—N/a	—N/a	Main	Main	Guest	Main
Fern Deacon	Agnes Duffett	—N/a	—N/a	Main	Main	Main	Main
Stuart Campbell	Jack	—N/a	—N/a	Main	Main	Main	Guest
Orla Hill	Emily Calendar	—N/a	—N/a	Main	Main	—N/a	—N/a
Hugo Cracknell	Edwin Calendar	—N/a	—N/a	Main	Main	Main	Main
Tabitha Bryon	Constance Calendar	—N/a	—N/a	Main	Main	Main	Main
Kate Williams	Mrs Whittock	—N/a	—N/a	—N/a	Main	—N/a	—N/a
Georgie Glen	Lady Grenford	—N/a	—N/a	—N/a	Main	Main	Main
Rhea Bailey	Mrs Brody	—N/a	—N/a	—N/a	Main	—N/a	—N/a
India Brown	Lizzie Duffett	—N/a	—N/a	—N/a	Main	Main	Main
Ben Radcliffe	Robert Grenford	—N/a	—N/a	—N/a	Main	—N/a	—N/a
Jack Wolfe	Charles/Samuel Buscombe	—N/a	—N/a	—N/a	Main	—N/a	—N/a
Jairaj Varsani	Ashock	—N/a	—N/a	—N/a	—N/a	Main	—N/a
Steve John Shepherd	Ambrose	—N/a	—N/a	—N/a	—N/a	Main	—N/a
Rihanna Merralls	Flo	—N/a	—N/a	—N/a	—N/a	Main	—N/a

== Episodes ==
Series	Episodes	Originally released	
Series	Episodes	First released	Last released
1	10	11 May 2015	6 July 2015
Special		25 March 2016	
2	10	10 May 2016	12 July 2016
3	10	8 May 2017	10 July 2017
4	10	7 May 2018	9 July 2018
5	10	3 May 2019	1 July 2019
Special		12 December 2019	
6	3	13 April 2020	15 April 2020

=== Series 1 (2015) ===
No. overall	No. in series	Title	Directed by	Written by	Original air date (CBBC)	Original air date (BYUtv)
1	1	"The Escape (Part 1)"	Paul Walker	Helen Blakeman	11 May 2015	18 March 2018
In Victorian London foundlings Hetty Feather and Gideon Smeed are fostered by the Cotton family until the age of five when they are taken to the foundling hospital, run by the austere Matron Bottomly and separated into different wings for boys and girls. Having sworn that she would look after Gideon Hetty makes efforts to see him, meeting Mathias, an older boy who looks after Gideon and who plans to escape and run away to sea. Hetty helps Mathias craft a letter to the man who will facilitate this and plans to join him and other boys in an escape attempt. However, thanks to the She-Mob, a group of nasty girls who seek to ingratiate themselves with Matron, she fails to join the escapees. Following the discovery that three boys have gone the hospital is subject to an even harsher regime. First Appearances: Hetty Feather, Gideon Smeed, Sheila Ormsby, Polly Renfrew, Harriet Summers, Elizabeth Flounder, Monica Clackett, Mathias Grigg, Matron Bottomly, Donald Cranbourne, Walter Brittle, Ned, Judd Mortimer, Nurse Winterson, Nurse Macclesfield, Mary Crane and Vince Rickard
2	2	"The Escape (Part 2)"	Paul Walker	Helen Blakeman	11 May 2015	18 March 2018
In Victorian London foundlings Hetty Feather and Gideon Smeed are fostered by the Cotton family until the age of five when they are taken to the foundling hospital, run by the austere Matron Bottomly and separated into different wings for boys and girls. Having sworn that she would look after Gideon Hetty makes efforts to see him, meeting Mathias, an older boy who looks after Gideon and who plans to escape and run away to sea. Hetty helps Mathias craft a letter to the man who will facilitate this and plans to join him and other boys in an escape attempt. However, thanks to the She-Mob, a group of nasty girls who seek to ingratiate themselves with matron, she fails to join the escapees. Following the discovery that three boys have gone the hospital is subject to an even harsher regime.
3	3	"The Tower"	Paul Walker	Helen Blakeman	18 May 2015	25 March 2018
Hetty tells her friends Harriet and Polly that it will soon be her and Gideon's birthdays as celebrated at the foster parents and, since the sexes are segregated, she must think of a way to meet Gideon for a celebration. When food is stolen from the kitchen Matron orders a lockdown but Hetty takes advantage of a rat infestation to get a message to Gideon and later, under the guise of helping the rat-catcher lay traps, she and her friends obtain access through the loft to a tower where they meet Gideon and his friends and establish their own den. Later that night the food thief is caught - it is Mathias who, having escaped, has returned to the hospital where he is hiding.
4	4	"Jack in the box"	Paul Walker	Sophie Petzal	25 May 2015	25 March 2018
Matron attempts to coerce a cowed Mathias into being her spy as she sets the orphans to work making toys, supposedly destined for charities though Gus discovers that she and tradesman Cooper are planning to sell them to stores for profit and leads the others in sabotaging the goods. They are almost caught but Mathias rescues them before explaining how he returned to the hospital to avoid being sold as a slave. Matron is angry when she sees the damaged toys but, as the children are falling ill due to lead paint, humane teacher Mr Cranbourne persuades her to stop her venture, pointing out that the governors would not be happy to know about her deal with a roguelike Cooper.
5	5	"Sisters"	Paul Walker	Emma Reeves	1 June 2015	1 April 2018
A new foundling arrives, a little girl called Eliza, who was fostered with the same family as Hetty though Hetty is disappointed that her borrowed brother Jem seems to have forgotten her. Matron also receives a visitor, her kindly sister Annie, appalled that Matron will not visit their dying mother. When Eliza takes revenge on Matron by shredding her clothes Hetty takes the blame and is put in solitary but Annie discovers the real culprit and rescues Hetty, explaining that she and her sister were also raised in a workhouse, hence Matron's severe attitude. Thus Hetty has information to use against her enemy and is also cheered to find that Jem has not forgotten her at all.
6	6	"Strike"	Chloe Thomas	Sophie Petzal	8 June 2015	1 April 2018
The foundlings must perform a hymn by composer Mr Melrose to sing at a charity lunch but they are bored by it so kindly Nurse Winterson teaches them a music hall song, with the result that Matron sacks her. Hetty, aware that the nurse is the sole provider for her invalid father, persuades the children to go on strike and refuse to sing at the lunch but Matron tries to call her bluff by threatening punishment. Fortunately, the children stage a concert of their own which so impresses Mr Melrose that he persuades Matron to reinstate Nurse Winterson.
7	7	"Raising the Flag"	Chloe Thomas	Helen Blakeman & Emma Reeves	15 June 2015	8 April 2018
The boys compete in a series of gruelling army tests in order to win a place out of the Foundling Hospital and into the big wide world as a drummer boy in the army. With Vince determined to beat his main rival Mathias, a bitter battle is set to turn nasty. Meanwhile, Hetty and Sheila are forced to work together in the infirmary as nurses tending to a sickly boy named Charlie. But will their rivalry get in the way of looking after the ailing patient?
8	8	"Foundling Reclaimed"	Chloe Thomas	Emma Reeves	22 June 2015	8 April 2018
A distraught couple have come to reclaim their child, but which foundling could it be? With Hetty determined to find out, someone could be leaving with the parents for good. But will Matron allow the foundling to be reclaimed without a fight? Meanwhile, Gideon plans on escaping in search of his parents, but Vince and Judd have other plans.
9	9	"Open Day (Part 1)"	Chloe Thomas	Helen Blakeman	29 June 2015	15 April 2018
It is open day at the Foundling Hospital. Hetty sees Madame Adeline there and thinks she could be her real mother, but Matron tasks Hetty with looking after Lord Upton's snooty daughter Charlotte. When it transpires that Matron has plans to send Hetty to India as Charlotte's maid, it seems Hetty's days as a foundling could be coming to an end. Will she ever find her mother again? Last Appearance: Mary Crane
10	10	"Open Day (Part 2)"	Chloe Thomas	Helen Blakeman	6 July 2015	15 April 2018
With Hetty finally escaped from the hospital in search of Madam Adeline, Matron is on the warpath and thinks she knows where to find the escaped girl. In the meantime, the gang come together to try to expose Matron's true intentions behind Hetty's planned trip to India. But can they get to the truth in time and will Cranbourne believe them?

=== Special (2016) ===
After the end of the episode, The End Of It All in series 4, a five-minute crossover between The Dumping Ground and Hetty Feather aired on CBBC, titled A Special Dumping Ground Adventure. Its official title (according to CBBC Online) is Floss The Foundling and has instead used this title online and in subsequent TV airings.

Title	Directed by	Written by	Original air date (CBBC)	Original air date (BYUtv)
"Floss The Foundling"	Makalla McPherson	Matt Evans	25 March 2016	25 March 2016
When Floss has to do the vacuuming. she ruins a picture that Tyler, Billie and Toni work on when they don't want her help. Floss falls asleep on the sofa and ends up in the Foundling Hospital. She encounters Hetty Feather, who introduces Floss to the Foundling Hospital ways. Sheila and Elizabeth are mean towards Floss and Hetty gets Floss out of trouble with Matron Bottomly. Floss and Hetty make friends. When Floss wakes up, she draws a replacement picture. Guest Starring: Sarah Rayson as Floss Guppy, Miles Butler-Hughton as Tyler Lewis, Gwen Currant as Billie Trent, Nelly Currant as Toni Trent and Stacy Liu as May-Li Wang.

=== Series 2 (2016) ===
No. overall	No. in series	Title	Directed by	Written by	Original air date (CBBC)	Original air date (BYUtv)
11	1	"Foundling Day"	Chloe Thomas	Helen Blakeman	10 May 2016	22 April 2018
Hetty risks getting into serious trouble with Matron when she makes a desperate promise. First Appearance: Ida Battersea
12	2	"The Haunting"	Chloe Thomas	Helen Blakeman	17 May 2016	22 April 2018
Hetty is shocked when a wealthy couple want to adopt one of her friends. Last Appearance: Polly Renfrew
13	3	"Words From Home"	Chloe Thomas	Emma Reeves	24 May 2016	29 April 2018
Hetty has a surprise visitor with important news, but can she meet him without getting caught?
14	4	"Changes"	Chloe Thomas	Abby Ajayi	31 May 2016	29 April 2018
Gideon tells a lie, which gets Hetty into trouble, and Matron has mysteriously disappeared.
15	5	"Blanche"	Chloe Thomas	Matt Evans	7 June 2016	13 May 2018
Hetty is determined to discover what secret Matron is hiding in the basement. First Appearance: Blanche Newbold
16	6	"Remember Me"	Delyth Thomas	Emma Reeves	14 June 2016	13 May 2018
A tragic accident brings Hetty and Sheila together to find the truth. Last Appearance: Monica Clackett
17	7	"Dreams"	Delyth Thomas	Joseph Lidster	21 June 2016	20 May 2018
Hetty is excited when an explorer talks about her adventures, and there's a snake on the loose.
18	8	"The Letters"	Delyth Thomas	Robin Mukherjee	28 June 2016	20 May 2018
Hetty plays a practical joke on Matron that has frightening consequences for everyone.
19	9	"Secrets and Plans"	Delyth Thomas	Helen Blakeman	5 July 2016	27 May 2018
Hetty discovers news that will change her life forever.
20	10	"The Reunion"	Delyth Thomas	Helen Blakeman	12 July 2016	27 May 2018
Will Hetty be able to keep the truth about her real mother a secret?

=== Series 3 (2017) ===
No. overall	No. in series	Title	Directed by	Written by	Original air date (CBBC)	Original air date (BYUtv)
21	1	"News From Nowhere"	Delyth Thomas	Helen Blakeman	8 May 2017	16 September 2018
Hetty receives some news that makes her want to escape. After successfully doing so Hetty learns just how dangerous the streets of London can be. Last Appearance: Ida Battersea
22	2	"The Unexpected Friend"	Delyth Thomas	Helen Blakeman	15 May 2017	16 September 2018
Hetty tries to join her mother only to learn that her mum could lose her job if they learn she had a child. As a result Hetty is forced to return to the Foundling Hospital. Meanwhile Matron learns of Hetty's hidden letters.
23	3	"The Break In"	Delyth Thomas	Victoria Asare-Archer	22 May 2017	23 September 2018
A street girl breaks into the hospital. Not wanting her to get into trouble, Hetty decides to disguise her as a foundling. However the Matron is on the prowl and wants the girl found at all costs. Last Appearance: Blanche Newbold
24	4	"Land of Opportunity"	Reza Moradi	Abby Ajayi	29 May 2017	23 September 2018
Many foundlings fall ill. The gang decides to investigate the cause. Meanwhile Hetty decides to find the Matron's secret book and get her terminated.
25	5	"Dangerous Game"	Reza Moradi	Gareth Sergeant	5 June 2017	30 September 2018
Vince blackmails Nurse Winterson so he can get special treatment. Meanwhile Hetty learns of a daring visit some of the foundlings are planning. Note: Ida Battersea returns for this episode
26	6	"Cannon Fodder"	Reza Moradi	Robin Mukherjee	12 June 2017	30 September 2018
Hetty tries to help Nurse Winterson, but her help ends up landing an innocent man with the label of being a thief. Last Appearance: Elizabeth Flounder
27	7	"The Last Sunday"	Reza Moradi	Joseph Lidster	19 June 2017	7 October 2018
Hetty tries to learn what Matron has planned for her. Meanwhile a fight amongst the boys gets out of hand when it spreads to some special visitors. First Appearance: Rosamund Calendar and George Calendar
28	8	"Farewell Service"	Reza Moradi	Matt Evans	26 June 2017	7 October 2018
It's Hetty's and everyone else's last day at the foundling hospital and everyone will be moving on and Matron appears to have special ideas for Hetty – she locks her in the cellar. But Gideon and Sheila find he and rescue her. When everyone finds out that Matron did this, they call for the police to arrest her but she escapes. Hetty decides to go to posh Calendar Hall with Sheila and Gideon and brings Matron's book with her. Harriet and Matthias go to New York. Absent: George Calendar Last Appearances: Nurse Macclesfield, Nurse Winterson, Harriet Summers, Mathias Grigg, Ned, Vince Rickard, Walter Brittle, Donald Cranbourne and Judd Mortimer
29	9	"New Beginnings"	Delyth Thomas	Helen Blakeman	3 July 2017	14 October 2018
Hetty begins a new life at Calendar Hall and is prepared to become a maid there. Meanwhile, Matron, now on the run, plots how to find Hetty and get her book back. Hetty, Sheila and Gideon meet their housekeeper and maids : Agnes, Lady Whittock and Jack. They also meet Rosamund- Lady of Calendar hall, George and children: Emily, Edwin and Constance. First Appearance: Agnes, Jack, Emily Calendar, Edwin Calendar and Constance Calendar
30	10	"The Past Returns"	Delyth Thomas	Helen Blakeman	10 July 2017	14 October 2018
Hetty and Gideon try to rescue a kidnapped girl but comes face-to-face with Matron which ends with Matron going to prison. Hetty visits her Mum. Last Appearance: Matron Bottomly Note: Ida Battersea returns for this episode

=== Series 4 (2018) ===
No. overall	No. in series	Title	Directed by	Written by	Original air date (CBBC)	Original air date (BYUtv)
31	1	"The New Arrival"	Reza Moradi	Helen Blakeman	7 May 2018	21 October 2018
Hetty discovers an explosive secret from Rosamund Calendar- she lost a baby years ago called Charles who she believes Matron may know of while Gideon fears he caused Edwin's life-threatening accident. Rosamund gives birth to another baby who she names William. New housekeeper Brodie arrives at Calendar Hall. First Appearance: Lady Grenford, Mrs Brody, William Calendar and Mrs Whittock
32	2	"Trouble"	Reza Moradi	Robin Mukherjee	15 May 2018	21 October 2018
Hetty is forced to cover when Rosamund goes missing on the day of William's christening, while Gideon and Jack find themselves in muddy trouble.
33	3	"Family"	Reza Moradi	Victoria Asare-Archer	21 May 2018	28 October 2018
A new arrival at the Hall threatens Agnes and Sheila's jobs while Gideon falls out with Emily. Sheila struggles looking after Constance. First Appearance: Lizzie
34	4	"Prisons"	Sallie Aprahamian	Joseph Lidster	28 May 2018	28 October 2018
Hetty steels herself to face her old enemy, while Lady Grenford introduces the family to her handsome young grandson, Robert. Note: Matron Bottomly returns for this episode
35	5	"For Shame"	Sallie Aprahamian	Hilary Frankland	4 June 2018	4 November 2018
Agnes's job is put at risk when her family secret is revealed, while Emily argues with her father about her future. Jack thinks Gideon has betrayed him.
36	6	"Wolves"	Sallie Aprahamian	Gareth Sergeant	11 June 2018	4 November 2018
Hetty and Gideon are shocked when a figure from their past turns up unexpectedly, while Lizzie is terrified by the story of a savage wolf boy on the grounds. Note: Vince Rickard returns for this episode
37	7	"Pride"	Sallie Aprahamian	Matt Evans	18 June 2018	11 November 2018
An accident in the kitchen forces Sheila to choose between loyalty to the cook and her own ambition, while Jack is stunned to discover the identity of a thief. Last Appearance: Mrs Whittock
38	8	"Fate"	Sallie Aprahamian	Jake Riddelt	25 June 2018	11 November 2018
It's the day of the fair and Gideon makes a surprising discovery about Jack, while Hetty realises Mrs Brody is out to get her. Sheila and Constance battle to become the Festival Queen
39	9	"Truth"	Reza Moradi	Matt Evans	2 July 2018	18 November 2018
Hetty and Gideon search for proof of Jack's innocence, while Emily discovers Mr Buscombe has a secret - but is he telling the whole truth? Lady Grenford has a startling plan for Emily and Robert.
40	10	"The Birthday Party"	Reza Moradi	Helen Blakeman	9 July 2018	18 November 2018
Hetty fights to reunite Rosamund with her long lost son, while Lady Grenford will stop at nothing to force Emily and Robert's engagement. Last Appearance: Mrs Brody Departed: Rosamund Calendar, William Calendar, George Calendar, Edwin Calendar, Emily Calendar, Constance Calendar and Lady Grenford

=== Series 5 (2019) ===
No. overall	No. in series	Title	Directed by	Written by	Original air date (CBBC)	Original air date (BYUtv)
41	1	"The Return"	Jennie Darnell	Helen Blakeman	3 May 2019	22 September 2019
Hetty and the gang play a prank on Sheila, but it has disastrous consequences when a young Indian visitor named Ashok with a secret arrives to stay at Calendar Hall, Sheila gets angry at him, which leads to her getting sacked. Departed: Sheila Ormsby Returned: Rosamund Calendar, William Calendar, Constance Calendar and Edwin Calendar First Appearance: Ashok
42	2	"The Proposal"	Jennie Darnell	Robin Mukherjee	3 May 2019	29 September 2019
Jack has a romantic proposal in mind, but a new butler named Ambrose and his daughter Flo spells trouble for the gang, his romantic news is put on hold while Ashok reveals his secret – there's a priceless diamond, rightfully his, hidden in Calendar Hall. And Hetty gets a letter from Harriet asking her to join her in New York. Will she go? First Appearances: Ambrose and Flo
43	3	"The Hidden Compartment"	Jennie Darnell	Hilary Frankland	13 May 2019	6 October 2019
The gang follow clues as they search for the Dawn Star- the priceless diamond, not realising that Ambrose is looking for it, too. Rosamund surprises everyone when she brings Lady Greenford back to Calendar Hall. Returned: Lady Grenford
44	4	"The Folly"	Jennie Darnell	Hilary Frankland	20 May 2019	13 October 2019
Hetty and the gang find crucial clues to the Dawn Star, although Flo and Ambrose are now watching them closely and Lady Grenford appears to know more about the diamond than she is letting on. She becomes friendly with Ashok.
45	5	"The Tunnel"	Jennie Darnell	Janice Okoh	27 May 2019	20 October 2019
Lizzie discovers a secret tunnel with a clue for the dawn star, while the gang races Ambrose to find the jewel, and Hetty fears that Ashok is growing too friendly with Lady Grenford.
46	6	"The Parchment"	Reza Moradi	Hilary Frankland & Joseph Lidster	3 June 2019	27 October 2019
The gang realise they need to break through a wall to get to the jewel – but can they do it without being discovered? And what will Agnes do when she finds out Gideon’s been lying to her?
47	7	"The Secret Door"	Reza Moradi	Gareth Sergeant	10 June 2019	3 November 2019
The gang are in danger when Rosamund leaves Lady Grenford and Ambrose in charge. Hetty finally cracks the code - but can the gang get to the Dawn Star in time?
48	8	"The Accused"	Reza Moradi	Julie Dixon	17 June 2019	10 November 2019
The gang finally discover the Dawn Star at the same time Lady Greenford, Ambrose and Flo do and when Lady Greenford realises it's stolen, she accuses Hetty of it and calls the police to arrest her. The gang help her to escape and eventually she does and goes on the run. Absent: Rosamund Calendar and William Calendar
49	9	"The Search"	Reza Moradi	Matt Evans	24 June 2019	17 November 2019
Hetty, on the run in London, is quickly brought to the workhouse where she discovers Sheila. Sheila helps her to escape from there. Meanwhile, the gang discover Ambrose has the dawn star. They gain a plan to prove Hetty innocent and Ambrose the real thief. Returned: Sheila Ormsby
50	10	"The Homecoming"	Reza Moradi	Helen Blakeman	1 July 2019	24 November 2019
Hetty meets the gang and they go back to Calendar Hall and stop at nothing to prove Ambrose the real thief. Eventually, Ambrose gets arrested, they re-discover the dawn star and give it to Ashok and Ashok leaves for India with it. Hetty decides she won't go join Harriet in New York. Last Appearance: Ashok and Ambrose

=== Christmas Special (2019) ===
No. overall	No. in series	Title	Directed by	Written by	Original air date (CBBC)	Original air date (BYUtv)
51	1	"A Christmas Adventure: Part One"	Ian Barnes	Helen Blakeman	12 December 2019	8 December 2019
Hetty comes up with a plan to get Sheila reinstated for Christmas, but when the street gang steals the food meant for the poor at church everyone gets separated. In the end tons of problems arise which might make it where the gang can't make it home for Christmas. Note: Matron Bottomly returns for this episode Absent: William Calendar
52	2	"A Christmas Adventure: Part Two"	Ian Barnes	Matt Evans	12 December 2019	8 December 2019
Hetty is held captive by Matron Bottomly and the street gang, Gideon tries to figure out how to help Sheila escape the workhouse, and Rosamund and Lady Grenford are in prison for looking poor. Seeing no other choice Jack and Agnes begin searching the streets hoping to help everyone make it back to Calendar Hall. Note: Matron Bottomly returns for this episode Returned: George Calendar Absent: William Calendar Last Appearances: Flo and Jack

=== Series 6 (2020) ===
No. overall	No. in series	Title	Directed by	Written by	Original air date (CBBC)	Original air date (BYUtv)
53	1	"The Final Chapter: Part One"	Reza Moradi	Robin Mukherjee	13 April 2020	31 May 2020
Hetty is dismissed when George blames her for insulting Rosamund, who has died in childbirth. Last Appearance: Rosamund Calendar Returned: Harriet Summers and Mathias Grigg
54	2	"The Final Chapter: Part Two"	Reza Moradi	Matt Evans	14 April 2020	7 June 2020
Hetty meets Matron living on the streets, while Mathias' reunion with the gang threatens his wedding to Harriet. Meanwhile, George plans to send his children away and return to India. Returned: Matron Bottomly, Walter Brittle, Ned, Judd Mortimer, Donald Cranbourne and Nurse Macclesfield Note: Jack and Vince Rickard return for this episode only
55	3	"The Final Chapter: Part Three"	Reza Moradi	Helen Blakeman	15 April 2020	14 June 2020
Hetty saves Matron from a street gang and Constance runs away to find Hetty. Mathias swears his love for Harriet, while Hetty is forced to return to Calendar Hall before she can move on. Returned: Nurse Winterson/Mrs Clark

== Home releases ==
The first series of Hetty Feather was released on DVD on 27 July 2015. The first season was given a U (Universal) and a PG rating by the BBFC for mild bad language, mild scenes of threat and peril, and mild adult themes (specifically scenes centred on death and bereavement). The second series of Hetty Feather was released on DVD on 18 July 2016.
