= Anna Fiorentini Theatre and Film School =

Part-time stage school in London

Anna Fiorentini Theatre & Film School is a part-time stage school, based in London. The school's founder and Principal is Anna Fiorentini.

The school was established in 2001 as a Prince's Trust Business. Since then, it has won three Business of London Awards and has a growing reputation within the performing arts industry.

Students aged 7 to 18 follow a time-table of Drama, Film, Singing, Dance & Musical Theatre. These classes are taught by leading professionals, and the school currently has a branch in Camden, Greenwich, Hackney and Docklands. The school also offers Fiorentini Weenies classes for students aged 4–6 years old.

Every year the school puts on a Variety Performance at the Hackney Empire. All students have the opportunity to take part in this show. Students are also encouraged to take part in competitions such as Fiorentini's Got Talent and Destination Dance.

To support children from low-income families that may struggle with fees, the school set up the Fiorentini Foundation to help provide bursaries and scholarships. In 2014, Anna Fiorentini set up Stage & the City, an adult performing arts school, to raise money for the Fiorentini Foundation. All profits from Stage & the City go directly to the charity.

== The Anna Fiorentini Agency ==
The Anna Fiorentini school also gives their students the opportunity to join their agency. Many of the schools students are given the opportunity to audition for professional work for TV, film, music videos, voiceovers and West End theatre productions. The Anna Fiorentini Agency (also known as the AF Agency) has a diverse range of children who are all very talented, professional and have a passion for performing.

== Graduates ==
A number of actors (theatre & screen) and music artists have attended the school, some include:

- Belinda Owusu (EastEnders)
- Charlie Jones (EastEnders)
- Jermain Jackman (Winner of The Voice UK 2014)
- Orla Hill
- Jaden Oshenye (The Bodyguard)
- Tahj Miles (Class Dismissed (TV series), Oliver!, The Lion King, Matilda, Bugsy Malone, Amil and the Detectives)
- Jayden Jean-Paul Denis (Hank Zipser)
- Harry Demmon (Good Night Mister Tom)

== Stage & the City ==
Stage & the City is a London-based adult performing arts company which was set up in 2014 as the adult branch of Anna Fiorentini. The company offers evening performing arts courses in various studios across central London. All profits from Stage & the City go directly to the Fiorentini Foundation.
