= Michael Gould (actor) =

British actor (born 1961)

Michael Gould (born 3 May 1961, in Ealing) is a British actor.

== Selected work ==
=== Stage ===
- In Extremis (Shakespeare's Globe, 2007)
- Othello, as Iago, Kathryn Hunter's touring Royal Shakespeare Company production, 2009
- Hamlet, as Polonius, Ian Rickson's staging at the Young Vic, with Michael Sheen, 2011
- The Writer Almeida Theatre, (2018)
- Vassa Almeida Theatre, (2019)
- All of Us (Royal National Theatre, (2022)
- king Lear as Earl of Gloucester (almeida theatre) (2024)
- The Cherry Orchard (Donmar Warehouse, (2024)
- Into the Woods (Bridge Theatre, 2025)

=== TV and film ===
- Mary Shelley's Frankenstein (1994) – Stablehand
- The Long Walk to Finchley (2008, TV Movie) – John Miller
- Private Peaceful (2012) – Mr. Monks
- Silent Witness episode: "Coup de Grace" (2 parts) (2014) – Peter Masham
- National Theatre Live: A View from the Bridge (2015) – Alfieri
- Our Kind of Traitor (2016) – Hugh Greenwood
- Rogue One (2016) – Admiral Gorin
- The Trial: A Murder in the Family (2017, TV Series documentary) – Simon Davis
- Darkest Hour (2017) – Lord Londonderry
- Radioactive (2019) – Judge Clark
- I Am Maria (2021) – John
- Showtrial (2021) - Paul Harwood
