= The Villains of Valley View =

American comedy television series

- Genre: Comedy
- Created by: Chris Peterson & Bryan Moore
- Starring: Isabella Pappas; Malachi Barton; Reed Horstmann; Kayden Muller-Janssen; James Patrick Stuart; Lucy Davis
- Composer: Kenneth Burgomaster
- Country of origin: United States
- Original language: English
- No. of seasons: 2
- No. of episodes: 37

Production
- Executive producers: Chris Peterson & Bryan Moore
- Producers: Kenny Byerly; Stefen Maekawa; Pang-Ni L. Vogt & Aaron Vaccaro
- Cinematography: Robin Strickland
- Camera setup: Multi-camera
- Running time: 24–25 minutes
- Production companies: Britelite Productions; It's a Laugh Productions

Original release
- Network: Disney Channel
- Release: June 3, 2022 – December 1, 2023

The Villains of Valley View is an American comedy television series created by Chris Peterson and Bryan Moore that aired on Disney Channel from June 3, 2022, to December 1, 2023. The series stars Isabella Pappas, Malachi Barton, Reed Horstmann, Kayden Muller-Janssen, James Patrick Stuart, and Lucy Davis. The series is available to stream on Disney+.

== Plot ==
Vic is a mad scientist who married electrical supervillain Eva. They have three children: Jake, Amy, and Colby. The family was previously in a villainous organization called the League of Villains led by the evil Onyx and operated in the city of Centropolis. When Onyx passes Eva over for a promotion to Chief Commander in favor of Slither, Amy tries to get Onyx to reconsider to no avail. Onyx insults the family, leading Amy to attack Onyx. Forced to flee Onyx's potential retaliation, the family goes on the run and settles in Valley View, Texas. They adopt the alias surname Madden and work to maintain ordinary lives while trying to keep themselves from being found by the authorities, superheroes, and Onyx's minions, while befriending their landlady's granddaughter Hartley.

== Cast ==
=== Main ===
- Isabella Pappas as Amy / Havoc, a teenage supervillain with sonic powers, who stands up to the head of the League of Villains, forcing her family to go on the run
- Malachi Barton as Colby / Flashform, Amy and Jake's younger brother who gains shapeshifting abilities after turning 13. He was originally named "Number 3" before getting a name. Colby is later revealed to be the Chosen One, a villain from each generation that develops multiple powers. Throughout the series, he has gained super-speed, invisibility, regeneration, kinetic manipulation, power transference through fist-bumping, and floating. Barton also voices Colby when he is in different forms.
- Reed Horstmann as Jake / Chaos, Amy's brother with super-strength who wants to become a better person. He does get a job as a waiter at The Round-Up Can-Teen-A.
- Kayden Muller-Janssen as Hartley, the Maddens' neighbor and Amy's best friend who learns that the Maddens are supervillains
- James Patrick Stuart as Vic / Kraniac, Amy's father who is a semi-competent mad scientist with genius-level intellect who makes different gadgets. In his civilian form, Vic becomes the substitute teacher of Valley View High School. The episodes "Family Secrets" and "Power Struggle" revealed that Vic had been the former superhero Silver Flame whose pyrokinetic powers were stripped from him by his brother Blue Granite on his parents' orders when they found out he was in love with Surge. Even though Vic's powers were lost during his kids' struggles to reclaim it, Colby transfers his kinetic manipulation to Vic.
- Lucy Davis as Eva / Surge, Amy's mother with electrokinesis who was working to become the Chief Commander of the League of Villains only for Onyx to give it to Slither. Eva does different odd jobs before working as a waitress at The Round-Up Can-Teen-A.

=== Recurring ===
- Patricia Belcher as Celia, Hartley's grandmother and the Maddens' landlady. The episode "Power Hungry" reveals that Celia has 7 ex-husbands where the 8th ex-husband is still missing.
- Steve Blum as Onyx, the leader of the League of Villains.
- Alec Mapa as Mr. Tennyson, a teacher at Valley View High School and member of the neighborhood watch who later becomes Valley View High School's principal.
- Isaiah C. Morgan as Milo, a student at Valley View High School who has a collection of superhero memorabilia. The episode "The Return" reveals that his real name is Milonius Theodore Cubbington V.
- Mariah Iman Wilson as Starling, a teenage superhero with flight, time-freezing abilities, and a powerful wind attack known as the Velocity Force who is Havoc's nemesis. The episode "A Superhero in Valley View" reveals that Starling's true identity is Judith.
- Harrison White as Robert, Celia's current boyfriend who is Valley View's chief of police.
- Giselle Torres as Gem, a popular student at Valley View High School who is Amy and Hartley's longtime nemesis.

== Production ==
On December 10, 2021, it was announced that Disney Channel had begun production in Los Angeles on Meet the Mayhems, originally scheduled to premiere in summer 2022. The series was created by Chris Peterson and Bryan Moore, who also serve as executive producers and showrunners. On April 28, 2022, it was announced that the series, under the new title of The Villains of Valley View, would premiere on June 3, 2022. On August 23, 2022, the series was renewed for a second season, which premiered on June 15, 2023. On October 2, 2024, it was announced that the series was cancelled after two seasons.

== Episodes ==
=== Series overview ===
Season	Episodes	Originally released	
Season	Episodes	First released	Last released
1	19	June 3, 2022	December 2, 2022
2	18	June 15, 2023	December 1, 2023

=== Season 1 (2022) ===
No. overall	No. in season	Title	Directed by	Written by	Original release date	Prod. code
1	1	"Finding Another Dimension"	Victor Gonzalez	Chris Peterson & Bryan Moore	June 3, 2022	101
The Maddens, a family of supervillains on the run, moves to a Texas suburb to live a normal life. Amy wants to get their lives back but Jake embraces becoming a good person. To keep his sister in check, Jake pushes Amy to befriend their neighbor, Hartley. While fighting over it, they accidentally send Hartley to another dimension using a gadget their father made. As they work on a rescue plan, the family stalls Hartley's grandmother by asking Colby to use his newly-found powers to shapeshift into Hartley. While rescuing Hartley from the other dimension, Amy is forced to use her sonic powers, revealing that she is the supervillain Havoc. She explains that her villain family is on the run because she stood up to the League of Villains leader Onyx for passing her mother over for a promotion to Chief Commander which was given to Slither with Onyx also insulting their family. Hartley promises to keep their identity a secret. Guest stars: Patricia Belcher as Celia, Mariah Iman Wilson as Starling
2	2	"Trust No One"	Victor Gonzalez	Chris Peterson & Bryan Moore	June 3, 2022	102
Worried that Hartley might expose their secret, the Maddens start looking for ways to blackmail her. Vic goes undercover as a science teacher to dig dirt on Hartley but he and Amy start competing and ruining each other's plans. Jake does not want to be involved at first but, in exchange for a better grade, he helps Vic frame Hartley for destroying the school statue. When the police get involved, the Maddens realize they've gone too far. Hartley reveals that she was on to them all along and assures them that they can trust her with their secret. Meanwhile, Eva and Colby go to Hartley's room to dig for dirt. To hide from Celia, Colby transforms into a sweater which Celia puts on and refuses to take off. Eva spends all day trying to get Colby back. Guest stars: Patricia Belcher as Celia, Merrick McCartha as Officer Collins
3	3	"The Villain Experience"	Victor Gonzalez	LaTonya Croff	June 10, 2022	103
Colby feels left out because he never got to have a supervillain experience. Amy and Jake offer to train him with Jake posing as Captain Valor, but they end up fighting between themselves instead of training him. After accidentally breaking Colby's leg, they take him to a vet instead of a regular hospital to avoid exposing their powers. Colby transforms into a turtle, but the vet calls animal control on it because it is a rare breed. Jake and Amy are forced to work together to get Colby out. Meanwhile, when the dry Texas heat causes Eva's powers to malfunction, Vic creates a humidifier and an AC to regulate humidity and heat in the house but they end up malfunctioning, which almost exposes the family during a visit from a suspicious head of the neighborhood watch. The family officially welcomes Colby to their supervillain team by giving him a suit and a name "Flashform." Though Colby can't get his helmet off. Guest star: Alec Mapa as Mr. Tennyson
4	4	"Belts, Bulls & Superfans"	Guy Distad	Omar Ponce	June 17, 2022	105
On Mother's Day, Eva forces her family to compete over getting her gifts where losers would be punished by spinning the Wheel of Torment. Amy enlists Hartley to help her to get an item from Milo who owns a huge collection of superhero memorabilia. Unable to afford what turns out to be Surge's belt that Surge lost fighting Monarch, Amy steals the belt while Hartley distracts Milo. Meanwhile, Vic and Jake raise money for their gifts which involves Jake riding a mechanical bull. However, Vic loses all the money after being defeated by Celia, the current record holder. Back at home, Eva tries unsuccessfully to remove Colby's helmet. When Milo catches up to Amy and Hartley, Eva helps them lie to Milo by passing off the lair as their own memorabilia. After Milo beats them in a challenge, Eva recognizes the belt as fake. Milo takes interest in Colby's helmet which he easily removes by unlocking a latch they hadn't noticed. Realizing the true meaning of Mother's Day, Eva decides not to punish her family for failed gifts. Guest stars: Patricia Belcher as Celia, Isaiah C. Morgan as Milo
5	5	"ColossaCon!"	Trevor Kirschner	Ken Blankstein	June 24, 2022 (Note: This episode was first released on Disney+ on June 22, 2022.)	104
Amy becomes determined to go to the ColossaCon superhero convention to get revenge on her nemesis, Starling, by dumping chrominite on her, which is Starling's weakness. She wants to prove herself because ever since Starling defeated her back in Centropolis, Havoc got turned into a meme and a joke. Despite Jake and Hartley's attempts to stop her, Amy bests them and goes to the convention. She dresses up as Starling and runs into Jake dressed as Captain Valor. When Jake interferes with her plans, Amy falls and is embarrassed to be saved by Starling. Jake goes to thank Starling because she once saved his life back in Centropolis after he was accidentally knocked off a building by Captain Valor, but to avoid exposing himself, he pretends that he is a fan who wants an autograph. Meanwhile, Colby uses his shapeshifting powers to scare people but he gets stuck as a towel. He scares Celia into lowering their rent by tricking her into believing that the house is haunted. Later, Jake looks at Starling's autograph only to realize that she wrote, "I know who you are." Guest stars: Patricia Belcher as Celia, Mariah Iman Wilson as Starling
6	6	"Super Secrets"	Danielle Fishel	Christine Zander	July 1, 2022	107
Suspicious after the events of the last episode, Jake ropes Hartley into going to the scene of Starling's next commercial gig in order to keep her from reporting her discovery to the Hero League. Meanwhile, Eva and Vic find the diary that Celia left behind and find information that she once robbed a casino. At the same time, Colby has randomly shapeshifted from a towel to a sledgehammer which comes in handy when Vic and Eva figure that Celia hid some money in their wall. When Celia eventually finds the hole in the wall causing Vic and Eva to come clean, she mentions that the supposed theft was from her creative writing class. Eventually, Starling comes to remember Jake as Chaos back when she rescued him after he was knocked off the ledge during his fight with Captain Valor. After freezing time, Starling agrees to remain quiet knowing that Jake is trying to be a better person. In the final scene, Celia enlists her boyfriend Robert to fix the hole. To the Maddens' surprise, Robert is also Valley View's Chief of Police. Guest stars: Patricia Belcher as Celia, Mariah Iman Wilson as Starling, Harrison White as Robert, Shay Roundtree as Jackson
7	7	"A Little Havoc"	Jody Margolin Hahn	Chris Peterson & Bryan Moore	July 8, 2022	106
With Celia having some friends over, Hartley ropes Amy into being a positive influence for a neighborhood girl named Scarlett who has a reputation and likes Havoc. This causes Amy's way of being a "good influence" to Scarlett to not go the way that Hartley hopes which even goes far enough for Scarlett to sell Colby (who has randomly shapeshifted from a sledgehammer to a ventriloquist dummy) to another girl named Kylie after lying that she threw him away. Meanwhile, Vic finds that Jake and Eva's powers have weakened and works on an invention to get them back to full strength. Instead, it causes Jake and Eva to switch powers which pleases Eva at first. After she experiences the flaws, Eva agrees to have both powers put back into her and Jake. After Amy has a talk with her in a tree, Scarlett contacts Kylie's parents as Kylie gives back Colby in exchange for receiving Scarlett's Havoc doll. In the final scene, it is shown that Eva still has some of Jake's super-strength when she accidentally rips off the door causing Vic to take her and Jake back to his lab. Guest star: Jaidyn Triplett as Scarlett
8	8	"The Two Jakes"	Jody Margolin Hahn	Kenny Byerly	July 15, 2022	108
Eva plan to volunteer herself at Valley View High School and has a trouble with the interview process at the hands of Donna Plank, the head of the cosmetic company FacciaGrande. One of the ways that Amy and Hartley try to help her involves using Colby who has randomly shapeshifted into a housefly. It seems to Eva that she has been in this slump since Onyx passed her over for a promotion. Meanwhile, Jake plans to go on a ride-along with Robert which disappoints Vic when he wanted to create mischief. To remedy this, Vic creates a bad clone of Jake that lasts for one day in order to do mischief with him. This backfires when Bad Jake accidentally gets taken on a ride-along with Robert as Vic and Jake go after him. Both plots collide at Valley View High School where Robert arrests Donna for assaulting a police officer and because FacciaGrande's face cream has allegedly scarred people while Jake defeats Bad Jake. Before Vic can go ahead with plans to vaporize Bad Jake, he and Jake find that he escaped and prepare themselves for when he returns. Guest stars: Patricia Belcher as Celia, Harrison White as Robert, Rachna Khatau as Donna Plank
9	9	"Battle for My Brother"	Robbie Countryman	Nick Rossitto & Patrice Asuncion	July 22, 2022	109
Amy overhears about Jake and Hartley's encounter with Starling. She even hears that Jake is going to see Starling again. Meanwhile, Vic finally finds a way to fix Colby's shapeshifting abilities with the help of a special invention. Once that was done, Colby had to remain sitting in the chair due to his molecules still pulling themselves back together. While Vic and Eva go to "obtain" a celebratory cake, Colby gets thirsty and Hartley goes to get a nearby bottle of water only for her to spill it on the console and cause the machine to age Colby to a teenager. Hartley's attempts to fix it causes Colby to age to a middle-age man. Amy confronts Jake and Starling at the junkyard. After Amy's scuffle with Starling and hearing why Jake was wanting to be good, this strains her relationship with Jake as he and Starling go their separate ways. Back at the house, Vic and Eva find out what happened and Vic plans to go to the lair to work on a solution only for Celia and Robert to barge in. When Celia and Robert see a middle-age Colby, Vic and Eva pass him off as a plumber as they want to see proof of it. During this time, Celia and Robert get distracted as Colby ages to an old man who passes himself off as the plumber's father who helped to establish Valley View's plumbing industry as Celia and Robert take their leave. Amy's friendship with Hartley is also strained when she confronts her about withholding the encounter with Starling. Vic and Eva tell Colby that they found a solution to get him back to his rightful age which will happen after Friday since they want to take advantage of the senior discount at the local movie theater. Guest stars: Patricia Belcher as Celia, Mariah Iman Wilson as Starling, Harrison White as Robert, John Gowans as Old Man Colby, Jonathan Medina as Middle Aged Colby
10	10	"Unleash the Chaos"	Monica Marie Contreras	Omar Ponce	July 29, 2022 (Note: This episode was first released on Disney+ on July 27, 2022.)	110
Continuing from the last episode, it has been days since the Starling incident. Jake and Hartley try to get Amy to forgive them. In order to win Amy back, Jake starts to act like a villain again which leaves Hartley worried. Meanwhile, Eva finds that Colby has been shifting back and forth between his current age and his old age causing Vic to invent a way to stabilize Colby. During one of the outings, Amy, Jake, and Hartley arrive near one of the transmission towers. When Jake agrees to not knock it over when Amy finally forgives him, it gets messed up thanks to Hartley causing the power to go down in Valley View. This affects Vic's latest way to get Colby stabilized as he and Eva instruct them to fix the transmission tower before Colby ceases to exist. After driving away the power crew by fooling them that another transmission tower has gone down, Jake puts the transmission tower back up while Amy hooks up the wires back up and has a hard time fusing the wires back together with her sonic abilities. In the nick of time, Eva shows up and uses her electrical abilities to fuse the wires. With the power restored to Valley View, Vic finally stabilizes Colby. The next day, things are alright with Amy, Jake, and Hartley. Hartley meets a new student named Declan and offers to give him a tour around Valley View. After Hartley walks away, Declan is revealed to be Oculan of the League of Villains who has traced Surge's electrical output to Valley View as he reports to Onyx and states that he will get to work identifying them. Onyx states that once they are identified and Oculon gains their trust, it will be the right time for the League of Villains to do a retributive attack. Oculon's eyes then shift to a different appearance. Guest star: John Gowans as Old Man Colby
11	11	"Havoc-Ween"	Monica Marie Contreras	Vanessa Mancos	October 2, 2022	111
The family receives a crystal ball in the mail, which contains the trapped body-snatching spirit of Eva's mother. Eva and Vic warn the children not to fall for any of their grandmother's tricks, and decide to put the crystal ball in the lair for safe-keeping. Hartley is excited for her annual Sunshine Club Halloween party, and invites Jake and Amy to attend. However, makes Amy promise not to pull any pranks or cause any mischief. Still wanting to have some fun, Amy decides to bring her grandmother's crystal ball to the party. Upon arrival, Amy tries to hide her grandmother from Hartley and accidentally shatters the glass ball. Her grandmother escapes and takes over the body of a scarecrow decoration, scaring a group of partygoers. Then, she decides to take over the body of Hartley. Hartley fights against the body snatch, but Amy's grandma decides that if she stays in Hartley's body forever then she can always be close to her family. Amy, wanting to save her friend, offers herself up for her grandmother. She takes the offer, but Jake captures her spirit in a snow globe before she can body snatch Amy. Meanwhile, Vic and Eva celebrate their first Halloween by scaring the neighborhood kids into handing over their candy. When Celia finds out, she rounds up a group of kids to put on Grim Reaper costumes and take revenge on the Madden parents. Guest stars: Patricia Belcher as Celia, Michelle Arthur as Grandma
12	12	"Showdown at the Round Up"	Danielle Fishel	Erika Kaestle	October 7, 2022	112
Amy and Hartley form a band to compete against their rival Gem at the Round Up. During practice, Hartley starts to get nervous causing Amy to find ways to help her. Meanwhile, Celia sets up cameras in the area as Vic and Eva suspect that they might've caught Colby using his shapeshifting abilities. Eventually, Celia ends up taking the cameras down when they showed Vic's robe opening up to reveal his boxers. After Celia has left, Vic and Eva find that Colby has developed super-speed and invisibility. Guest stars: Patricia Belcher as Celia, Giselle Torres as Gem, Tyler James White as Tomas
13	13	"Friend or Foe"	Trevor Kirschner	Ken Blankstein	October 14, 2022 (Note: This episode was first released on Disney+ on October 12, 2022.)	113
Amy is suspicious that Hartley is dating Declan. In order to prove her suspicion, Amy persuades Celia to come with her to stake out Hartley's date with Declan with various results. Meanwhile, Eva has gotten a job at a pizzeria where its proprietor is known for not making the pizzas fast. Vic plans to remedy this by getting into the pizza business and inventing a machine that speeds up the pizza production. After different comical outcomes, Jake informs Vic that the proprietor found out about him horning in on his business causing Vic to give him the proceeds. When Eva asks if she still has a job, the proprietor just walks off laughing. Vic later tells the family that they will have to have the remaining pizzas for a while. Declan contacts Onyx to let him know that he is close and will come up with a plan to get into their house. Guest stars: Patricia Belcher as Celia, Kai Moya as Declan / Oculon
14	14	"Vials and Tribulations"	Bryan McKenzie	LaTonya Croff	October 21, 2022	114
Amy and Hartley get tickets to Fuschia! and get busted when it turns out that the teacher Mr. Tennyson has become the new principal. When he gives them detention for being late, Amy and Hartley plan to use one of the temporary amnesia vials that Vic has invented. Due to a mishap, Vic gets exposed to one of the vials around the same time he is trying to impress Mr. Tennyson. Now Amy and Hartley must work to help the former's father get through an interview that offers him chances of a promotion. Meanwhile, Eva gets a job at the Round Up and is told by Jake about a secret shopper. She gets suspicious that Celia might be the secret shopper when she shows up. Guest stars: Patricia Belcher as Celia, Alec Mapa as Mr. Tennyson
15	15	"A Superhero in Valley View"	Danielle Fishel	Nick Rossitto & Patrice Asuncion	October 28, 2022	115
Starling has returned to Valley View under her civilian name of Judith. She is incognito in Valley View, where her superiors have accused her of aiding Chaos and Havoc. During her time of hiding, Judith is contacted by Captain Valor who states that the charges against her will be lessened if she can hand Chaos over to them. Meanwhile, Bad Jake resurfaces and returns to the Maddens. He shrinks Vic and Eva leaving Colby to fight Bad Jake. Upon developing regenerating abilities, Colby subdues Bad Jake. To help Starling, Amy and Jake trick an approaching Captain Valor by letting him apprehend Bad Jake in his Chaos outfit. Captain Valor takes Bad Jake away while telling Judith that she will still be punished for her actions. Guest star: Mariah Iman Wilson as Starling
16	16	"We Don't Care"	Jody Margolin Hahn	Erika Kaestle	November 4, 2022	117
A Battle of the Bands has been established at the Round Up as Amy and Hartley go up against Gem's band. However, Eva will not let them use a villain song in the Battle of the Bands competition. Eventually during the performance, Eva helps them out by using her version of "special effects" so that Amy and Hartley can beat Gem's band. Meanwhile, a delivery person drops off some recliners that were meant for Celia as Vic, Jake, and Colby do their own type of modifications to them with hilarious results. Guest stars: Patricia Belcher as Celia, Giselle Torres as Gem
17	17	"Bad Energy"	Jody Margolin Hahn	Kenny Byerly	November 11, 2022	116
Onyx is getting impatient with Declan not having found official proof that Surge's family are hiding in Valley View. He threatens Declan to find the proof or else he is to return to Centropolis and be punished. Vic is wanting the old helmet he made for Flashform as Amy and Colby are unable to tell them that they gave it to Milo. Using the different helmet, Colby as Flashform goes up against Milo and his different superhero artifacts. Meanwhile, Vic and Eva find that their lair has raised the electric bill and work to cover it up to Celia by doing a special fitness program in their front yard that Jake, Hartley, and Declan get involved in as the latter plans to have Hartley get him into the house. When Celia comes across the program, she is enticed into motivating the exercisers. Eventually, it was discovered that the electric bill was for Celia's house as she does not disclose what in her house is responsible for this. Upon developing kinetic manipulation, Flashform puts Milo into a state of surrender and claims the helmet. In the final scene, Declan finds Flashform's current helmet and unknowingly activates its teleportation ability that takes him into the lair. Declan contacts Onyx telling him that he now has the proof that he is looking for. Guest stars: Patricia Belcher as Celia, Isaiah C. Morgan as Milo, Kai Moya as Declan / Oculon
18	18	"No Escape"	Victor Gonzalez	Chris Peterson & Bryan Moore	November 18, 2022	118–119
Declan covers up his visit to the Madden family's lair when Hartley comes looking for him. He persuades the Madden family to accompany him and Hartley to a surprise trip to a new escape room. On the day of the escape room visit, Colby stays home to watch the season finale of "Idiot Circus" much to the dismay of Declan. In a discussion with Onyx, Declan is told that Colby won't be a problem since Colby didn't have powers last time they saw him. In a transmission, Declan reveals his true colors as Oculon, who reveals that the "escape room" is immune to their powers as he plans to take them to Centropolis so that Onyx can imprison them. Meanwhile, Celia joins Colby in watching "Idiot Circus" as Hartley wonders where everyone is. She finds the Maddens in their trap as Oculon arrives. Hartley uses Vic's fusion blaster to knock down Oculon. However, Hartley accidentally reveals in an intercom discussion to the Maddens about Colby's powers, enabling Oculon to escape upon knowing that Colby is the "Chosen One". When Celia leaves, Oculon appears in the house where he makes off with Colby and his Flashform outfit. After Hartley uses the fusion blaster to destroy the door, she and the Maddens receive a transmission stating that Onyx and Oculon now have Colby. Onyx and Oculon have Flashform in their clutches. The Maddens regroup at their house and suit up into their supervillain aliases in order to go to Centropolis and rescue Flashform. While also making use of his Dematerializer, Vic and Celia get supplies to help them in their plans to rescue Colby. Onyx declines Oculon's offer to take down the Maddens as Onyx prepares to expect the Maddens. Amy and Jake become Havoc and Chaos and head to Centropolis. Onyx counters Colby's abilities with his immobilizing ray. Vic and Celia hear from Hartley that Havoc and Chaos have headed to Centropolis upon getting tired of waiting for them to return as Hartley stows away in the Dematerializer. Havoc and Chaos deduce that Onyx and Oculon are hiding in their old lair as Oculon attacks them. As Oculon traps Havoc and Chaos with his heat vision, Surge and Kraniac show up and join the fight. Hartley was released from the Dematerializer as she destroys Oculon with the fusion blaster. Having watched this from the screen, Onyx mind-controls Flashform into attacking his family. He catches up to the Maddens and goes on the attack. At Surge's suggestion, Havoc uses her sonic hypnosis in an attempt to break Flashform from Onyx's mind-control. This frees Flashform from the mind-control. Before the Maddens can return Hartley to Valley View, Onyx arrives as he recalls that he didn't promote Surge because she is weak as he defeats Surge and Kraniac. He proceeds to immobilize the Maddens as he plans to transfer Flashform's powers to him. At the persuasion of Havoc, Colby uses his kinetic manipulation to combat Onyx's draining as Havoc also screams enough to destroy Onyx leaving his mask behind which gets destroyed by Hartley using the fusion blaster. Afterwards, Hartley sees the Maddens' old lair as they take the time to reminisce. Noting that their old lair doesn't feel like home anymore, the Maddens take Hartley back to Valley View. Before they can return to Valley View, they are visited by a female supervillain named Imager. She notes that she is not going to attack them and states that Havoc has destroyed Onyx. As a result, she is now the new leader of the League of Villains per the villain creed. Guest stars: Patricia Belcher as Celia, Kai Moya as Declan / Oculon
19	19	"How the Villains Stole Christmas"	Victor Gonzalez	Rick Devine	December 2, 2022	120
Hartley tells the viewers a Christmas story that took place years ago where Onyx issues a ruin Christmas challenge. Havoc comments to Surge and Chaos that they can steal the Centropolis Christmas tree while Kraniac and Number 3 have stolen all the smart go-karts. To win Onyx's challenge, Havoc, Surge, and Chaos run into a complication with a teenager named Savannah whose family have seen the lighting of the Centropolis Christmas tree every year. When they managed to pull it off, they find that Savannah has hidden in the Centropolis Christmas tree where they take her captive as she plans to tip off the police with her phone while trying to find some reception. Havoc finally uses her sonic attack on Savannah. When she obtains her phone, Havoc finds that her father James is away on military duty where she wanted to get photos of the Christmas tree. As Chaos gets Savannah out of their lair without seeing it, Havoc has been moved by Savannah's plea and is unable to keep the Centropolis Christmas tree as it reminded her of two birthdays when Kraniac was fighting Climate Captain and Lava Lantern. Meanwhile, Kraniac and Number 3 find out that the display model for the smart go-kart is being raffled off as they plan to obtain it by entering the raffle with Kraniac using the alias of Jack McWaxey with his raffle ticket is signed with magnetic ink as he plans to get the elf into wearing a magnetic glove. Number 3 bribes the elf into letting him take his place. When it comes time for the raffle, Number 3 pulls out the ticket that Jack McWaxey is named on. The crowd praises him much to Kraniac's surprise which leaves them moved by the Christmas spirit. When it comes to the tree lighting, Savannah finds the Centropolis Christmas tree as it wasn't connected causing Havoc to have Surge light the tree. Suddenly, James arrives after his company commander gave his unit a 24-hour pass for the holiday. Chaos later admits that he loves Christmas as Kraniac gives away stolen merchandise from his sleigh pulled by Number 3 on the smart go-kart while planning to get something in return. Hartley narrates that the villain family kind of live happily ever after as she wishes everyone a happy holiday. Guest stars: Rylee Alazraqui as Savannah, Carlos Alazraqui as James

=== Season 2 (2023) ===
No. overall	No. in season	Title	Directed by	Written by	Original release date	Prod. code
20	1	"Villain Number One"	Guy Distad	Chris Peterson & Bryan Moore	June 15, 2023	201
In light of Onyx's defeat, Havoc has been made the new leader of the League of Villains. Surge claims that Havoc ruling the League of Villains would be tough to do as most of the family wants to return to Valley View. Following a visit from Celia, Vic asks Colby to shapeshift into their elderly neighbor so that they can be put in the will. Hartley tells Amy that she can have a good life in Valley View. Entering the family lair, Amy sneaks off to Centropolis. As Havoc, she meets with the League of Villains members. Principal Tennyson visits the Maddens where he is partaking in a neighborhood watch power-walk. He wants them to attend his event where he can ridicule parents for their failure to set their teenage kids straight. Havoc meets a new villain named Shadow and takes some advice ranging from dealing with Onyx's support monster. After Havoc departs back to Valley View, Shadow begins to plot behind her back. Amy gets busted by Jake who has to keep quiet about it to Hartley. After they walk out, Onyx's support monster shows up in the lair. It gives itself away as Hartley finds out while Celia knocks on the door. At Principal Tennyson's event, Colby shows up at the event where he learns that Vic has put a child lock on his powers due to his misuse. As Jake deals with Onyx' support monster, Hartley and Amy work to distract Celia. Principal Tennyson talks about how Colby disappears during a pop quiz as Celia mistakes the parental lock remote of Colby's powers. He warns them that if Colby does anything weird again, he will have the superintendent conduct a full investigation. Back at the house, Onyx's support monster swallows the teleportal remote. After Jake gets it to regurgitate the teleportal remote, Amy opens the teleportal as Jake pushes it through it. Celia's continue work on the parental lock remote affects Vic and Eva's being interviewed with the superintendent. Due to Eva's controls being set off, Colby holds Principal Tennyson responsible for the faulty fixtures. After Hartley walks out, Amy gets Jake's apology for underestimated him as she admits that the family considers her a screw-up. As Amy teleports back to Centropolis as Havoc, she meets Shadow who mentions that the monster was adopted as Shadow reveals that she is Onyx's daughter and plans to overthrow Havoc in order to become the leader of the League of Villains. Inheriting her father's immobilization, Shadow plans to make Havoc pay for what she did to Onyx. Shadow traps Havoc in a special cage and plans to have the base blow up. To fool the Maddens, Shadow uses her replication and voice-matching abilities to assume Amy's form. Arriving in Valley View, Shadow's Amy form and covers up her disappearance by stating that she was shopping. Celia invites the Maddens to a movie night in the park as Shadow pretends to know about movie night. Back in Centropolis, Havoc works to get out of her special cage as the first explosion occurs. At the park, Celia picks out a spot to watch the shark movie as Colby plans to do a shark prank on everyone as Hartley gets suspicious with Amy. Shadow's attempts to attack the Maddens keeps getting interrupted by Hartley's suspicions and Celia getting in the way. Back in Centropolis, Havoc is found by Hartley and has brought Starling to help free her. Starling works to disable to second generator. As the Maddens work to pull off their prank, they are confronted by Shadow who sheds her disguise as she prepares to attack. Shadow introduces herself to the Maddens while mentioning that she is the daughter of Onyx and that she plans to get even with the Maddens. Colby tries to reason with Shadow to delay her attack. Back in Centropolis, Starling plans to use her Velocity Force powers to break Hartley's special cage, which works. They get out before the final explosion. Then Amy, Hartley, and Starling arrive to confront Shadow. Amy and Shadow then duel each other as their silhouettes are cast onto the screen at the movie. Starling joins the battle as she and Amy work to fight Shadow as they combine their powers to send Shadow flying. Afterwards, Amy thanks Starling who takes her leave. Colby then takes the form of the shark only to find that the movie is over. At home, Vic and Eva get Amy's confession of what she did as Vic and Eva won the bet of what device she would use to get to Centropolis. When Amy claims that she wanted to prove that she can be a leader, Vic wants Amy not to do anything without them. Hartley then talks with Amy about how she trusted her. Meanwhile, Shadow awakens far from Valley View as she plans her revenge. Just then, she is confronted by Onyx's ghost who states that they Maddens haven't destroyed his spirit unlike how his body was destroyed. Guest stars: Patricia Belcher as Celia, Alec Mapa as Mr. Tennyson, Dora Dolphin as Shadow, Mariah Iman Wilson as Starling, Steve Blum as Onyx
21	2	"Power Hungry"	Monica Marie Contreras	Erika Kaestle	June 23, 2023 (Note: This episode was first released on Disney+ on June 16, 2023.)	203
Hartley is preparing the Sunshine Club for the arrival of known founder Mary Stephens. As she struggles to get everything made the right way to impress her, Hartley takes advantage of Colby's new power transference through fist-bumping to temporarily gain his super-speed. Before she can give it back after being persuaded, Hartley loses control as Amy and Colby work to coral her when Mary arrives to consider Hartley for the award. Meanwhile, Jake gets involved in a contact given by a true crime podcast where he partners up with Celia to find a missing diamond which resembles the one that Kraniac stole for Surge. When Celia finds it, Jake pretends that it is a fake by crushing it. Though this does not bode well for Eva. In the final scene, Amy learns that Hartley won't be getting the reward as Amy states that Hartley still does a lot of good around Valley View. Guest stars: Patricia Belcher as Celia, Lanise Renee Frederick as Mary Stephens
22	3	"Dojo Mojo"	Victor Gonzalez	Nick Rossitto & Patrice Asuncion	June 30, 2023	204
Jake is shown to not be respected by anyone. So he plans to join an after-school karate club at Valley View Karate Class so that he can regain his respect. Amy joins the karate club to knock people down without consequence. They find that Milo is the best student in the dojo as Jake learns why he is the best student in the dojo. Jake plans to find a way to use Milo's momentum against him. Meanwhile, Colby tries to get a Sky Gordon's sneakers as he helps Hartley get one by standing a chance against the bots. They find that Vic had bought all of them so that he can re-sell them for profit with his super-bot R.A.L.P.H. causing Colby and Hartley to plan their revenge. Jake prepares for a rematch where he manages to use Milo's momentum against him and accidentally sends him flying through a wall. Jake claims to Amy that his reflexes have caused him to use his super-strength as Amy works to get him to apologize. It doesn't go well as Amy works to make him give up his respect. Colby and Hartley claim that they put mustard in Vic's shampoo and did not sabotage R.A.L.P.H. Eva is revealed to be behind one of the Sneaker-Bot and that Vic bought knockoffs called Sky Bordons. Due to maxing out the credit cards, Vic is now in so much debt. Amy lures Milo back to the Valley View Karate Class as he is made to witness her spar with Jake. Milo breaks up the sparring and admits that he joined the karate classes because he was a nobody at school. Touched by this, Jake has Milo flip him in order to regain his dojo respect. In the final scene, Amy and Jake return home where Jake states that he can respect himself and that he finally made a friend in Milo. As Vic heads out to his second job teaching night school, Eva tells Amy and Jake that she has money that she will not waste bailing him out of his debt. Guest stars: Isaiah C. Morgan as Milo, Danny Wayne as Jimmy
23	4	"Overnight Success"	Jody Margolin Hahn	Ken Blankstein	July 7, 2023	205
At The Round-Up Can-Teen-A, Amy and Hartley work to get people to follow their Mad Heart group online at The Round-Up Can-Teen-A's anniversary. They run into their rival Gem who states that she's up to 1,000 followers. Hartley suggests that they do a music video to help them get followers. Amy gets an idea to build up their followers. Meanwhile at Valley View High School, Principal Tennyson accuses Colby of covering the courtyard in tin foil by Principal Tennyson's niece Daphne as a witness as he gives him a month's detention. Wanting to find out if Daphne framed him, Colby receives help from Eva. At the same time, Vic works on putting in a bathroom in the lair with comical results. Amy edits the music video where she passes off her sonic hypnosis as a special effect much to the surprise of Hartley. When Hartley asks Vic for advice on how to undo the sonic hypnosis in the music video, he claims that it can be undone by playing the music video backwards. Colby and Eva's plan to expose Daphne backfires when Principal Tennyson finds his laptop in Eva's back. After Principal Tennyson walks away accusing, Daphne is out for revenge on Colby because she took the last chocolate milk where she had to wash down her BLT with normal milk "like an animal" which Eva finds petty. Hartley goes ahead with her plan which goes horribly awry when it turns everyone who watches into superfans much to the annoyance of Gem. They are chased back to their house where Jake is also affected. As Vic accidentally flooded the lair, he placed the villain outfits in the living room. Upon finding out what happened, Vic notes that nobody can learn their secret. Back at Valley View High School, Colby's latest plan involving chocolate pudding shooting out of the locker succeeds where Colby has been cleared of charges and Daphne gets detention. While noting that she was not given a detention before, Daphne tells him that his victory won't be long. With help from Vic, Mad Heart perform a concert on the front porch in front of everyone where Amy undoes the hypnosis. Once that was done, the spectators leave the property. Gem arrives as Amy claims that their fans have lost interest. At The Round-Up Can-Teen-A's anniversary show, Mad Heart performs alone. Gem overhears the sonic hypnosis comment from Amy as she claims that she knew something was off with Amy where she plans to find out what it is. Guest stars: Alec Mapa as Mr. Tennyson, Giselle Torres as Gem, Mia Akemi Brown as Daphne
24	5	"Party People"	Jody Margolin Hahn	Kenny Byerly	July 14, 2023	206
Today is Hartley's birthday as Celia tells Jake about her plans to spend her birthday with her at Madame Millicent's Tea House as Amy and Hartley come down in the dresses that Celia picked out. After Celia leaves, Hartley admits that she only takes part in the tea party in order to not disappoint her grandmother. Colby states that his parents are taking him to a water park to pull some pranks leaving Amy and Jake at the house. Amy plans to throw Hartley the best weekend now that her parents are going out of town. Amy invites a ton of people to attend the party she is throwing for Hartley. Vic mentions that he put in extra security measures that not even Eva and Colby's powers could penetrate. Upon entering a dilemma, Hartley turns to Jake for advice on how to go to both parties and enlists him for help. In the lair, Vic is disappointed in Eva and Colby not finishing their list where Colby's new surfboard hit the button that activated the security measures. They can't contact anyone because Vic and Eva's phones are in the car. Hartley goes to the birthday party that Amy is throwing her. Hartley goes back and forth between the parties with Jake helping to distract both Celia and Amy at both parties. Back in the lair, Vic brings out the Particle-izer to rearrange the matters in order to get through the door. When it is used on all used up, it causes their heads to be rearranged upon collision. Due to Celia putting pressure on Jake, Celia finds out that Amy threw a party for Hartley causing Celia to bring the tea party to Amy's party. Amy works to sabotage the dancing of Celia's friends with varying results. Back in the lair, Vic, Eva, and Colby work to control each other's bodies in order to rewire the Particle-izer. Once it is done, they use the Particle-izer to regain their bodies. It turns out that Vic had his phone all along when he gets a call from the hotel as he comments that his cargo shorts have too many pockets. Hartley gets disappointed with Amy and Celia's competition and breaks up the party. She then admits to Celia that she outgrown the tea parties which Celia has been waiting for Hartley to mention. Afterwards, Hartley admits to Amy that she should've been honest with her as she proceeds to throw another party with Celia and the Maddens as Vic falls when he tries to "Drop It Like It's Hot". Guest stars: Patricia Belcher as Celia, Eartha Robinson as Dancer #1, Judy Nazemetz as Dancer #2, Randi Cee as Dancer #3, Cindera Che as Dancer #4, Stella Choe as Dancer #5
25	6	"Vases, Volcanoes & the Green-Eyed Monster"	Lilan Bowden	Pang-Ni L. Vogt & Aaron Vaccaro	July 21, 2023	207
Eva is in need of a rage outlet since Vic started wearing rubber underwear. Hartley suggests that she finds a hobby. She finds one outlet by signing up for pottery class. As Amy is unwilling to accompany Eva to the pottery class, Hartley offers to go to the pottery class with Eva. At Valley View High School, Colby informs Vic that he enters the science fair by making a volcano as Vic suggests that they build a robot with human emotions. Jake claims to Colby that Vic will take over a project like he did during Chaos' fight with the superheroes. Colby plans to stick to his volcano as he finds out that Milo is going to be in the science fair. After hearing about Eva and Hartley's success at pottery class at the hands of Sergio, Amy is annoyed that Eva has been shirking their plans. Having gotten jealous, Amy persuades Celia into attending pottery class with her by claiming that she can make weapons there. Once they are at Valley View Pottery, Amy and Celia reach their station. Meanwhile, Colby works to get his volcano to erupt as Jake offers to help him with Colby claiming that Jake wanted to get even with Vic for making him look like a chump in front of the superheroes which infuriates Vic. Back at Valley View Pottery, everyone works on their vase. At the science fair, Colby notes that Jake is starting to take over projects like Vic has as Milo mocks the volcano while having collaborated with Vic to make a robot that feels emotions called Emototron. Unfortunately, Emototron overdoes it on the hug he does for the judge. Due to it feeling anger, Emototron goes on a rampage. Back at Valley View Pottery, Amy and Celia struggle with making their vase as Amy turns up the wheel against Hartley's advice sending clay everywhere. Eva orders Hartley to turn off the wheel as she avoids the flying clay to do that. She does so at the cost of the vase that Sergio got from his grandmother. Amy then takes her leave commenting "three's a crowd". Back at Valley View High School, Jake learns that Vic had repurposed Emototron from one of his Destructobots. Colby gets his volcano working as it erupts foam much to the dismay of Vic and Milo. Colby states to Vic and Jake that he didn't want their help as he wanted to follow in Vic's footsteps. Vic states that he would be better at something else and that he takes over something if anyone fails. Later that night, Eva and Hartley mention to Amy that they were thrown out after Celia scattered Sergio's grandfather. As Hartley goes home, Amy admits to Eva that they can't talk about feelings as they are villains and got jealous with Eva hanging with Hartley. Eva admitted that she did find an outlet for her rage as they then break pottery in the lair. Back at Valley View High School, Milo finds out that Vic used him as a pawn and that Milo had rebuilt Emototron who now works better than ever. Emototron then emotes vengeance as it chases Vic to "give it a hug". Guest stars: Patricia Belcher as Celia, Isaiah C. Morgan as Milo, Carlos Lacámara as Sergio, Steve Blum as Emototron, Mark Huber as Judge
26	7	"Fired Up"	Robbie Countryman	LaTonya Croff	July 28, 2023	208
Eva and Jake come home from work where Jake tells Amy and Vic that he got promoted to shift supervisor at The Round-Up Can-Teen-A. The next day, Mr. Ruffin asks that he not show any weakness when working as shift supervisor where he is told to reprimand Eva who showed up late for getting pulled over for running a stop sign. Amy states to Jake she is prepared to fill out the comment cards. Meanwhile, Hartley comes in as she and Vic find that Colby has a fever. When Hartley offers to make soup, Vic claims that supervillains suffer glitches with their powers. Celia shows up to hide from Marion as Colby accidentally transfers his invisibility to Celia. Back at The Round-Up Can-Teen-A, Eva works to cook the food due to the bad grill as Amy enlists the customers to fill out the comment cards. After the grill catches fires, Mr. Ruffin calls Jake into his office. Meanwhile, Hartley and Vic work to find a way to get Celia to fist-bump Colby as Colby continues glitching. They even work to get this fixed before Robert shows up. Back at The Round-Up Can-Teen-A, Jake tells Eva that his job is on the line as Eva is reluctant to admit she accidentally started the fire as she claims that the fire wasn't her fault as she claims that there is something wrong with the grill. Unconvinced of the claim, Jake fires Eva. After Eva left, Amy scolds Jake for this and walks out. Mr. Ruffin then arrives stating that the grill was responsible because of the wiring. While reluctantly taking the blame for what happened, Mr. Ruffin learns that Jake fired Eva for the incident. Meanwhile, Robert has arrived as Hartley orders Colby to get his powers back from Celia. It is then discovered that Celia had transferred the invisibility to Robert. As Hartley works to keep Celia busy, Vic works to get Robert to transfer the invisibility to him until Colby's fever breaks. After Colby's fever breaks, he successfully gets his powers back from Robert. After Celia and Robert left, Colby uses his invisibility to sneak out. Later that night, Jake apologizes to Eva for not believing her about the grill malfunction. He also tells Eva that he asked Mr. Ruffin to give Eva the position of shift supervisor. The next day, Celia visits the family and accidentally punches Colby in the hand causing her to get his super-speed as she runs into the kitchen. While Colby and Hartley go after Celia, Vic stays behind as he crashes on the couch. Guest stars: Patricia Belcher as Celia, Harrison White as Robert, Rodney J. Hobbs as Mr. Ruffin
27	8	"The Scare"	Victor Gonzalez	Erika Kaestle	August 4, 2023	209
Gem announces that she has started a gossip channel where she plans to reveal the secret of Amy. She leads Hartley in a plan to retrieve the footage. Meanwhile, Vic and Eva get pranked by Jake and Celia. To get Amy and Hartley into Gem's house, Colby poses as Gem in order to give Gem's butler Wallace a day off. When Gem gets back soon, Amy, Hartley, and Gem work to hide even when Wallace returns. When Gem states that she can't find her laptop, Wallace states that there is a tracker on each of her electronics. Meanwhile, Vic and Eva get back at Jake with a Dicky Spooks doll which sends him flying upward and then think that the plant Celia gave him had a snake in it. Jake then falls on Celia. Back at Gem's house, Gem activates the locator app on her phone causing Colby to use his kinetic manipulation. She ends up finding Amy, Hartley, and Colby under the table when Amy's snorting gives them away. As Wallace takes the rest of the day off, Gem decides to go live with Amy's secret as Hartley brings up what happened at the Little Miss Valley View pageant 10 years ago where Gem had been humiliated by a rival contestant. That's what caused a personality change to Gem. Amy then struggles with Gem to get the laptop. Meanwhile, Celia is in a body cast after Jake fell on her and states that she told the doctor that the Maddens will take care of her while she was recuperating for a while. This turns out to be a prank by Celia and Jake on Vic and Eva where Celia just has some minor injuries. Back at Gem's house, the struggle over the laptop continues as Amy and Hartley try to get Gem from not exposing the bad guys where she claims that she is a hypnotist where she has been giving people what she wants. When Gem is accidentally knocked down, Amy uses her sonic attack on a fallen chandelier to keep it from hitting Gem when she wasn't looking. Colby advises Gem to be nicer to people. Amy agrees not to tell everyone about Gem's pageant incident. The next day at Valley View High School, Gem approaches Amy and Hartley where she is trying her hand at being a nice person until Hartley tries to get her to join the Sunshine Club. Amy then states that Gem is starting to grow on her. Guest stars: Patricia Belcher as Celia, Giselle Torres as Gem, Christopher Carroll as Wallace the Butler, Steve Blum as Dicky Spooks
28	9	"Family Secrets"	Victor Gonzalez	Chris Peterson & Bryan Moore	August 11, 2023	210
After learning about Hartley's ancestors, Amy is wanting to learn more about her family's origin as Vic is being secretive about it. She looks up Kraniac on the villain database and it just says "See Surge". Meanwhile, Colby develops a floating ability at the time when Jake is being awarded the "Student of the Month" award as Principal Tennyson wants Colby to remain to support Jake since the other family members won't be in attendance. Jake works to get Colby to get control of his floating abilities so that he won't accidentally give their family's secrets away. As Colby holds on to the large horse head ice sculpture, Jake gives his speech before the attendees. Colby then floats until he falls onto the buffet. Amy goes through Vic's locker and gets it opened. They find some information where Vic was originally Jack Thomas and see a name of someone named Ty Thomas. Back at Valley View High School, Principal Tennyson claims that Colby is jealous of Jake and wants him to give a speech. Vic finds out that Amy broke into his locker and hears about her claims about Ava and learns about the arrival of Ty. Upon arrival, Ava learns that Ty is a superhero named Blue Granite and that Vic was originally the superhero Silver Flame where his power was taken away by Blue Granite on his parents' orders for dating Surge. Vic still blames Silver Flame for not siding with him in the family argument. Back at Valley View High School, Colby starts floating again during the speech as Principal Tennyson thinks that they are putting on a balance act. Back at the house, Vic is in his lair as Amy apologizes for bringing her brother to Valley View. When Amy asks if Vic misses his family, he states that he does. Blue Granite then enters after triggering the lair's entrance. After Amy departs, Vic uses a device to duel Blue Granite as he is unaware about the real reason why his family is in Valley View. Blue Granite states that he kept the vessel that held the silver flame. He'll return it to him if he can return to being a superhero. Later that night, Amy and Hartley find Jake and Colby returning home. Blue Granite takes his leave as Jake and Colby learn who he is. Guest stars: Alec Mapa as Mr. Tennyson, Derek Theler as Blue Granite
29	10	"Power Struggle"	Victor Gonzalez	Chris Peterson & Bryan Moore	August 18, 2023 (Note: This episode was first released on Disney+ on August 16, 2023.)	211
Continuing with the last episode, Amy, and Jake go on a mission to reclaim their father's powers from their uncle as Havoc and Chaos. Hartley and Colby work to distract Vic and Eva for as long as possible. When Havoc and Chaos enter Blue Granite's lair, they are surprised when they are confronted by Blue Granite who is actually Flashform in disguise. Using a reality show clip, they find where the container with Vic's powers. Just then, they are confronted by Blue Granite. Meanwhile, Hartley assumes that Colby is continuing to pose as Eva until she finds herself interacting with the real Eva. She and Vic find out where their kids are as they head out with Hartley not far behind. Havoc, Chaos, and Flashform are confronted by Blue Granite as they try to get the container holding their father's powers from him. During this time, Vic and Eva arrive as Kraniac and Surge alongside Hartley. During the struggle, the container breaks as Blue Granite mentions that Vic's powers are gone forever. Despite their differences when it came to the day that he met Surge, Kraniac states to Blue Granite that they can still be family. Back at the lair, Colby transfers his kinetic manipulation to Vic so that he can still have a superpower. In the final scene, the Maddens watch television as Hartley proposes that they clean up the neighborhood tomorrow. Vic uses his kinetic manipulation to push Hartley away as he states that he can get used to this power. Guest star: Derek Theler as Blue Granite
30	11	"Hidden Hero"	Danielle Fishel	Lia Woodward & Leah Folta	September 17, 2023	212
Jake informs Amy and Hartley about how he could do nothing after a car crashed into the pole. He plans to become a secret hero in Valley View since it has no superheroes present. Meanwhile at The Round-Up Can-Teen-A, an annual eating contest that involves a spicy pepper called the Poltergeist occurs where Celia has been the champion in. Wanting to finally beat Celia at something, Vic enters the contest. When Vic plans to make some special peppers with one not spicy for him and very spicy for Celia, Eva refuses to help him rig the contest without her boss finding out and firing her. After Hartley saves Bodhi from falling from a ladder at Valley View High School, Jake becomes jealous as he ends up extending his saving. At the county fair, Vic still goes ahead with the fixing as he has Colby use his invisibility to sneak in the different genetically-modified peppers. As Colby proceeds to go to work, Eva sumbles upon it. Meanwhile, an exhausted Jake enters where the newspapers are still talking about Hartley which he throws in front of Amy. Hartley comes in showing the video that Celia sent her. She also mentions that she has been offered an award by the pageant committee for rescuing Bodhi. After Hartley leaves, Jake plans to become more public with his heroics. At the county fair, Amy confronts Jake about using his powers as he mentions that he rigged a tree branch to break when he does a super-tantrum. When the branch breaks, he will catch the branch. Not wanting Jake to use his powers, Amy uses her sonic band powers to immobilize her. When it comes to the pepper-eating contest, Colby secretly tells Vic that he swapped the peppers as Celia does her pre-gaming. The contest begins as they eat the Poltergeist pepper where it turns out that Eva swapped the peppers so that he would eat the Poltergeist granting Celia the win. At the award ceremony, Due to Vic having touched his eyes with the Poltergeist liquid, he bumps into his kids causing the branch to fall with Hartley saving Vic leading to her praised again. Hartley finds out that Jake faked being a hero as both of them apologized for acting up on their parts. She also claims that he can do small heroic things. Back at home, Vic uses a small freeze ray to cool down his mouth as Eva states that he hoped he learned his lesson. Celia comes in and gives him some ice pops to sooth his burning tongue. Unfortunately, it is habanero pepper flavor as he runs off in pain. Eva asks Celia how much she owes her. Guest star: Patricia Belcher as Celia
31	12	"The Promposal"	Danielle Fishel	Nick Rossito & Patrice Asuncion	September 24, 2023	213
At Valley View, Amy and Milo got a laugh at the Spanish teacher Mr. Fuenta throwing up on a student that caused a chain reaction. Hartley is a member of the Planning Committee and is going to be holding the school dance at The Round-Up Can-Teen-A. A promposal is then made by Milo who wants Amy to go to the dance with him. This leaves Amy surprised. Not wanting to hurt Milo's feelings, Amy reluctantly accepts. Meanwhile, Colby informs Eva that weird things have been happening around the house ever since Colby gave Vic his kinetic manipulation. Both of them see that Vic needs pointers on using this ability. At The Round-Up Can-Teen-A, Hartley and Jake argue about the theme of the dance. Milo tells Amy that she needs to follow some pointers. After Milo left, Daphne appears vowing to make Amy pay for taking Milo to the dance with her stating that they aren't officially a couple yet and also not getting the messages she left in his locker. When Hartley arrives, Amy talks to her about stepping aside. This led to Amy to talk to Milo for Daphne. Meanwhile, Colby teaches Vic some kinetic manipulation using some of Jake's stuff as it is discovered that Vic has been overthinking it. At Valley View High School, Amy finds Milo in a fake goatee made from dog hair as she tries to persuade him to go with Daphne to no avail. On the night of the dance, Amy finds that Hartley was replacing Jake's Under the Sea theme with Hartley's Beneath the Stars theme. Amy goes to confront Milo as he tells his mom to give them some space. After Milo goes to get his corsage from Amy back, Amy is confronted by Daphne for "romancing" Milo and vows that she will have her revenge by taking care of "it". Meanwhile, Colby is hiding from Vic who wants to give him the kinetic manipulation back. Colby and Eva start a fire in order to get Vic to use his kinetic manipulation. As Vic an Eva argue, the fire happens as Vic finally masters his kinetic manipulation to put it out. Back at The Round-Up Can-Teen-A, Hartley tells Jake that the combined themes are getting positive responses. Amy persuades Milo to be himself with Daphne as both of them are terrible at social interactions. Her plan works with help from her vocal manipulation. A fake octopus falls on Amy's head as Daphne started that she took care of "it". In the final scene, Amy and Jake come home to learn about Vic has almost mastered his kinectic manipulation. Guest stars: Isaiah C. Morgan as Milo, Mia Akemi Brown as Daphne
32	13	"The Haunted Jukebox"	Victor Gonzalez	Ken Blankstein	September 29, 2023	214
On Halloween, Eva ropes the family into helping out at a Halloween party at The Round-Up Can-Teen-A as Amy wants to go see the final Cruddy Lip concert. A jukebox that plays the song "Monster Town" and is said to be behind different disappearances. After Amy was displeased with what befell her Cruddy Lip concert, she and Hartley are transported to an alternate reality where she finds a vampire version of Jake and a mummy version of Colby. They meet a version of Celia called the Good Witch who informs them that they are in Monster Town. She explains that they must find the two halves of the enchanted vinyl record. One half is in possession of Frankenstein's monster and the other half is with the swamp creature. If they are not reunited in time for the Good Witch to put it back together at the jukebox by midnight, Amy and Hartley will be stuck in Monster Town forever. Mummy takes Amy to the swamp creature who is a version of Eva who prefers to be called "swamp lady". She traps them so that she can get her alligator. Vampire takes Hartley into the lab of Frankenstein's monster who is a version of Vic who is very attached to his stuff. When Hartley tries to ask for the half of the record, Frankenstein's monster won't give it up as Hartley offers to play Monster-nopoly with Vic. Back at the swamp lady's swamp, Mummy temporarily rips his arm off to get out in order to get free and untie Amy. They work to nurture the swamp lady since she is part plant. The swamp lady states that the record is her only connection with the outside of the swamp. To appease her, Amy and Mummy scratch the swamp lady's back. When the swamp monster still won't give up the record, Amy and Mummy snatch it. Meanwhile, Hartley states to Frankenstein's monster that the half of the record won't make him human. Amy and Mummy get caught up as the swamp lady also shows up where she develops a crush on Frankenstein's monster. Amy, Hartley, Vampire, and Mummy take their leave as swamp lady dates with Frankenstein's monster. When they give up the halves of the records to the Good Witch, she is revealed to be the Bad Witch who plans to use the halves of the record to go to Amy and Hartley's world in order to destroy it. In addition, Vampire and Mummy work for her as a side hustle. As the Bad Witch has the swamp lady and Frankenstein's monster tied up, Amy and Hartley learn from Vampire and Mummy that the Bad Witch rules Monster Town as the swamp lady and Frankenstein's monster claim that she feeds off of misery. To spread joy, Amy and Hartley sing a song from the haunted jukebox with help from the monsters. This was enough to destroy the Bad Witch as Amy and Hartley claim the record. Once the record is in the jukebox, Amy and Hartley find themselves back in Valley View as Vic, Eva, Jake, and Colby are in the costumes of their monster counterparts. As Amy apologizes for what she said, she helps her family get the party started as Celia is among the party guest. Amy secretly destroys the haunted jukebox and then joins Hartley in performing their song from Monster Town as everyone starts dancing. Then everyone shouts "Happy Halloween". Guest stars: Patricia Belcher as Celia, Hayley Bochner as Dancer #1, Doran Butler as Dancer #2, Sara Gonzalez as Dancer #3, Annabelle Maliwanag as Dancer #4, Alex Tho as Dancer #5, Jalen Youngblood as Dancer #6
33	14	"Guitar Hero"	Danielle Fishel	Pang-Ni L. Vogt & Aaron Vaccaro	October 8, 2023 (Note: This episode was first released on Disney+ on October 4, 2023.)	217
At Valley View, the Battle of the Bands is three days away. Hartley advises Amy that they need to make a great song for The Mad Heart as they once again go up against Gem who is still working on being nice. Later that day, Amy and Hartley discover that Jake has a talent in playing the guitar. As the Battle of the Bands doesn't accept solo act, Jake wants to join Amy's band much to her reluctance as she gets outvoted. Meanwhile, Colby finds Vic and Eva babysitting her co-worker's baby. Robert shows up with his canine trainee Rex where he wants them to babysit him. Rex's barking makes the baby cry. Amy is still reluctant to have Jake perform where he managed to write a song for the band. Hartley praises Jake for the lyrics she raid as she tells Amy that the contest is 5 hours away. Despite Hartley's plea, Amy throws Jake out of The Mad Heart. Meanwhile, Eva and Colby work to get the baby and Rex to be quiet. They stop making noise until Vic comes in with a device that turns bad sounds into good sounds. When it is used on them, the dog starts crying and the baby starts barking due to the fact that their voices were actually swapped. Eva gets a text from Robert stating that he is coming to pick up Rex. Before Vic can swap their voices back, Rex eats the button. Later that night at The Round-Up Can-Teen-A, Amy shows her new song about her angst towards her brother and forgot to write the drum solo. To Amy and Hartley's surprise, Jake has joined up with Gem and the Other Girls where he has been hired to do other jobs for her. Amy has a plan as Hartley claims that this plan involves getting even with Jake. Meanwhile, Robert shows up to pick up Rex as Vic advises Eva and Colby to distract Robert while he fixes the device with the baby and Rex in the lair. After fixing the device, Vic gets both Rex and the baby back to normal as Colby briefly swaps their voice by accident. Eva tells Vic that the baby's mother is on her way to pick her up. Back at The Round-Up Can-Teen-A, Amy was revealed to have sabotaged Jake's guitar where he shocked it with Eva's charging volt. He works to withstand the pain as Amy ends up in a guitar battle with Jake with blackout results that gets both bands disqualified. Arriving home, Amy apologizes to Hartley for losing the Battle of the Bands as Hartley states that nobody's perfect. While Hartley leaves to watch a tutorial on kazoo playing, Amy tells Jake that he was right about what he said and admits that he's good at everything while stating that music is everything she's good at. Jake admits that music is Amy's joy and that he'll find something else to do. Guest stars: Giselle Torres as Gem, Harrison White as Robert
34	15	"Bad Influence"	Victor Gonzalez	Joshua Krilov	October 15, 2023	219
Starling shows up in Valley View wanting to resign from superhero work due to the different mistakes that she made like crashing into a Havoc pinata at a birthday party. She persuades Amy to let her hide out at her family's house. Meanwhile, Vic and Eva get an OmegaBox 4 console for Jake and Colby, but end up hogging from Jake and Colby in order for Vic and Eva to defeat each other in Power Smashers 2. Amy tells Starling to use her time powers to help her get breaks much to the dismay of Hartley. Meanwhile, Jake and Colby come up with a plan to get Vic and Eva away from the OmegaBox 4. Once that was done, they are lured into the basement where Vic and Eva repurposed the controls that Vic created to control Colby's powers to control Jake and Colby for a live version of Power Smashers 2. Starling returns where she reveals to Amy and Hartley that her time-based powers are glitching. Ava tries to use her sonic abilities in an attempt to get Starling back to normal. Meanwhile, Vic and Eva continue controlling Jake and Colby which gets all four of them exhausted. As Vic and Eva leave to the lair's snack bar, Jake and Colby get hold of the controllers and reconfigure them in order to get back at Vic and Eva. Starling then blips into the lair for a brief moment. Hartley figures out a pattern to Starling's blipping as she manages to hurt Starling enough to stop the blipping. With Starling back to where she started, Amy and Hartley advise Starling to balance her life and that she should admit that she should have a break as Amy gets a sonic attack on Starling. When Amy and Hartley enter the lair, they find Jake, Colby, Vic and Eva exhausted as a result of their "family game night". Eva states that the next time they want to play a game that brings the whole family together, they won't. Colby then says "or at least find a game that doesn't involve controlling real people". When Amy asks how there can be a game that can control real people, Jake shows Amy by controlling her into using her sonic attack. Amy states that this is the game that the whole family can play together as the other family move in wanting to have a turn. Guest stars: Mariah Iman Wilson as Starling, Ivy Perkins as Female News Reporter
35	16	"A Tale of Two Havocs"	Bryan McKenzie	Kenny Byerly	October 22, 2023	215
As the Madden family is watching a polar bear movie, Jake shows Amy a video of Havoc doing different moves as Amy assumes that it is an imposter. This causes Amy to plan to go to Centropolis as Havoc with Colby as Flashform coming with her. Meanwhile, Hartley is planning a Save the Bees Auction as Celia intimidates Vic and Eva into attending. Vic and Eva plan to use the Silencer invention that Vic made in order to win some prizes that include a week long trip to Hawaii. At Centropolis, Havoc and Flashform find the Havoc imposter breaking into the bank online. They meet the imposter named Ellie who is a fan of Havoc and mentions that Havoc disappeared the day she left Centropolis before she can make plans to extinguish the beacon on top of the Superhero Tower. In addition, Havoc is off the Superhero Top 100 while Flashform made the list. In order to regain her reputation, Havoc plans to extinguish the light on top of the Superhero Tower. Meanwhile at The Round-Up Can-Teen-A where the Save the Bees Auction is, Vic and Eva begin to put their plans into action as they go up against Celia and the other auctioneers. It works all the way to the week long trip to Hawaii which makes Hartley jealous. She finds the Silencer which Celia competes against Vic and Eva and accidentally silences them causing Celia to win the auction. Back in Centropolis, Havoc, Flashform, and Ellie work to get to the top of Superhero Tower as Havoc uses her sonic abilities to propel herself to the top. After crashing into a fire escape, Flashform plans to pose as Havoc using a zipline to get to Superhero Tower only for Ellie to come up with an idea to pose as her. Meanwhile, Celia unknowingly unmutes Vic and Eva as Jake is informed of the Silencer. Vic and Eva admits their scheme infuriating Hartley. To get the Silencer back, Vic and Eva reluctantly give Celia their prizes. Back in Centropolis, Flashform sets up the zipline as Havoc talks Ellie into taking her place. Flashform takes over the livestream until the other superheroes notice their activities causing them to flee. After successfully getting away, Havoc admits that Ellie is a big fan as she plans to come back one day to extinguish the beacon on Superhero Tower. Moments later, Hartley rants to Vic and Eva about sabotaging the Save the Bees auction where Celia is taking Robert to Hawaii as they find out about Havoc's attempt to extinguish the beacon on Superhero Tower. In addition, Hartley has placed a beehive on the Madden family house in retaliation for the bees not getting a meadow cleared for them. Back in Centropolis, Ellie finds her backpack when she is ambushed by Shadow who finds that Ellie is Havoc. Upon not being able to get answers on where Havoc is, Shadow tells Ellie not to tell Havoc about seeing her as Havoc will be in for a "big surprise". Guest stars: Patricia Belcher as Celia, Dora Dolphin as Shadow, Olivia Taylor Cohen as Ellie
36	17	"The Return"	Jody Margolin Hahn	Chris Peterson & Bryan Moore	October 29, 2023	218
Vic fakes injuries to get out moving the nuclonium barries as he gets Jake and Colby to move them. Amy gets out of helping Hartley with the Sunshine Club's mural. As Harley finishes the mural, she is ambushed by Shadow who traps her and replicates her appearance while leaving Onyx's ghost to watch Hartley as she goes to round up the rest of the family. Eva is the first to be targeted as she is easily subdued. When Shadow's Hartley form comes back in, she accidentally gives herself away causing both of them to face each other. Meanwhile, Vic starts a moving company with Jake and Colby where they find that their first client is Milo who is wanting him to clear out the garage of Milo's superhero memoribilia and move them to a storage facility behind the garbage dump. During the job, Vic recognizes the Supernova that villains have been stealing as the gas would target the villain cores and destroy them. Amy and Shadow are still fighting each other as Shadow states that Hartley and Eva is at the school with a "special guest. Amy runs off as Shadow states that she is playing into her hands. Meanwhile, Vic, Jake, and Colby learn from Milo that he got Flame Fatale's autographed boots where the Supernova was in. As Milo walks off to get his father's banking app password, Vic plans to pocket the device and they begin to sneak away only for Blue Granite to show up as Flame Fatale accidentally sent the boots to Milo. Milo then arrives and finds Blue Granite in her garage as he explains Flame Fatale's screw-up. Milo proceeds to dodge both parties and activates his special lasers. At Valley View High School, Amy finds a trapped Hartley and Eva as Onyx's ghost arrives. Shadow subdues Amy. Just then, Milo arrives with the Supernova to hide in the locker only to stumble onto the group. As Milo prepares to activate the Supernova, Amy tells Milo that she's Havoc and comes clean about her family's secret. Vic, Jake, Colby, and Blue Granite then arrive as Milo is surprised with Blue Granite's relation to her. Colby traps Shadow in his net form as Blue Granite frees everyone from the immobilization. Onyx's ghost proceeds to knock down Amy as he divides while Blue Granite subdues Shadow. After knocking down Vic, Eva charges herself up so that she can fight off Onyx's ghost. With help from Blue Granite, Eva knocks him back. Shadow grabs the Supernova as Onyx's ghost orders her to release the Supernova despite her objection that they'll both be destroyed. When Shadow refuses, Onyx's ghost releases the Supernova as Blue Granite gathers the Maddens and Shadow into a forcefield that Eva charges as Onyx's ghost is vanquished. With Onyx's ghost gone, Shadow surrenders to Blue Granite who takes her away in handcuffs. Milo faints after what he has seen. Back at the Madden house, Hartley states that she is not going anywhere without Amy again. Blue Granite arrives where he mentions that there are 5 more Supernovas like it. Just then, Milo comes in warning them about what is on the news. The Maddens turn on the news which reveals that an unspecified source has leaked information that there are supervillains residing in Valley View. Guest stars: Derek Theler as Blue Granite, Isaiah C. Morgan as Milo, Dora Dolphin as Shadow, Steve Blum as Onyx
37	18	"A Very Villain Christmas"	Danielle Fishel	LaTonya Croff	December 1, 2023	216
Hartley tells the viewers about the time when the Madden family had their first Christmas in Valley View. To avoid Celia retaliating at the Maddens for cutting down her tree, Hartley offers to have the Maddens help her out while wanting to keep Celia calm until her next anger management theory. Celia ropes Colby into helping her decorate. Amy and Jake want to get the Vumps headphones. Ambushing Vic and Eva when they try to plant them under the tree, they find that they got knockoffs called Zumps. Amy and Jake head over to the next town over. Vic and Eva are visited by Principal Tennyson who mentions about a Christmas decoration contest and a grand prize. They enter the contest in order to beat Celia. After helping Celia, Colby receives a Troll in a Bowl from her and he believes it is function enough to continue helping Celia. In the next town over, Amy and Jake find that the last two Bumps were purchased by Hartley who wanted a pair of Bumps. Meanwhile, Vic and Eva struggle to put up the decorations as Colby ends up helping them with the lights and reindeer while trying to keep Principal Tennyson from stumbling onto this activity. Amy and Hartley try the Zumps on which doesn't help as they break. Hartley appears stating that she returned the Bumps in order to spread some Christmas cheer. Colby finishes cooking for Celia as he finds the Troll in the Bowl in a different section. After Celia walks out, Hartley finds that Celia gave him her Troll in a Bowl as he learns about how Celia tricked both of them into being good. Amy and Hartley find the store has been closed. As Jake goes home, Amy sneaks into the store. Though Jake returns after ripping the back door off the hinges and disabling the security systems. Amy and Jake then fight over the Bumps until they are caught by the store's owner Mr. Garcia. During the contest judging, Principal Tennyson find that Vic and Eva put up their decorations fast. He states that the winner will be interviewed on TV. This does not bode well to Vic and Eva as the latter secretly causes a shortout. Principal Tennyson guesses that they overloaded the fuse box. Celia comes to check up on Colby as she hears the Troll in the Bowl talking to her to leave Colby alone and to fix it by buying the Madden family a Christmas present. Once Celia is gone, Hartley comes out as Colby was revealed to be in the form of the Troll in the Bowl. Back at the store, Amy and Jake explain to Mr. Garcia on why they broke in and lets them off after Hartley explained to him after what she said. Upon learning a lesson and the truth about the Christmas spirit. On Christmas Day, the Madden family find Hartley and Celia having made breakfasts and given them presents. As Hartley receives the Bumps from Amy and Jake, they find that Vic and Eva lied about not finding the Bumps. Celia gives her gifts to the Madden family as Vic gives her a vase of plants. After the Christmas story, Hartley states that she got the best gift ever. Upon putting on the Bumps, Hartley quotes "Happy Holidays everyone". Guest stars: Patricia Belcher as Celia, Alec Mapa as Mr. Tennyson, Frank Gallegos as Mr. Garcia

== Reception ==
=== Critical response ===
Sourav Chakraborty of Sportskeeda said, "The Villains of Valley View proved to be quite a resounding success for the Disney Channel as it recorded good viewership and critical reception. The season also ended on a very interesting note, leading to an interesting premise for the second one." Alex Reif of LaughingPlace.com asserted, "The Villains of Valley View primarily looks for laughs through over-the-top physical comedy or wacky characterizations. The storylines offer enough for parents to watch the show with their kids, but most of the laughs will be drawn exclusively from the show’s target audience." Stephanie Snyder of Common Sense Media gave The Villains of Valley View a grade of 3 out of 5 stars, complimented the depiction of positive messages and role models, citing optimism, and said, "Silly Disney sitcom is fun for the whole family."

=== Accolades ===
The series was nominated for Outstanding Stunt Coordination for a Live Action Program and Outstanding Cinematography for a Multiple Camera Live Action Program at the 2023 Children's & Family Emmy Awards.
