= Fern Deacon =

English actress

- Education: Sylvia Young Theatre School
- Occupation: Actress
- Years active: 2010–present
- Television: Ackley Bridge; Hetty Feather

Fern Deacon is an English actress. She is known for her roles as Chloe Voyle on the Channel 4 drama Ackley Bridge and Agnes Duffett on the CBBC series Hetty Feather.

== Early life ==
When Fern Deacon was five, her parents enrolled her in acting classes, and at the age of 11, she was accepted into Sylvia Young Theatre School.

== Career ==
In 2011, Deacon made her professional acting debut in a stage production of Kin at the Royal Court Theatre, and later that year, she played the younger version of Electra in an adaptation of Electra at the Gate Theatre. Deacon made her television debut in "Amy's Choice", an episode of the BBC series Doctor Who. She then appeared in three episodes of the BBC supernatural drama The Secret of Crickley Hall.

In May 2017, Deacon portrayed the role of Catherine Davis in the Channel 4 docudrama The Trial: A Murder in the Family. Later that year, she began portraying the role of Chloe Voyle in the Channel 4 school drama Ackley Bridge. In the same month, she began appearing in the CBBC series Hetty Feather as Agnes Duffett, a role she portrayed until 2020. In 2018, she appeared in an episode of the BBC drama Shakespeare & Hathaway: Private Investigators as Lily Rattle.

== Filmography ==
Year	Title	Role	Notes
2011	Doctor Who	Unnamed	Episode: "A Good Man Goes to War"
2012	The Secret of Crickley Hall	Susan Trainer	3 episodes
2013	Father Brown	Kathleen Knight	Episode: "The Mayor and the Magician"
2013	Casualty	Ria Jones	Episode: "Isolated Incident"
2013	The Unbeatables	Young Lara	Film; voice role
2014	Call the Midwife	Gillian Glennon	Episode #3.6
2014	Penny Dreadful	Young Mina	Episode: "Closer Than Sisters"
2015	Molly Moon and the Incredible Book of Hypnotism	Hazel	Film
2015	The Enfield Haunting	Margaret Hodgson	3 episodes
2015	Fungus the Bogeyman	Lucy	3 episodes
2016	Doctors	Jane Farlow	Episode: "Miss Bates"
2017	Uncle	Emma	Episode: "Dinner, I Hardly Knew Her"
2017	Harlots	Jenny	Episode #1.4
2017	The Trial: A Murder in the Family	Catherine Davis	Main role; 5 episodes
2017–2022	Ackley Bridge	Chloe Voyle	Main role
2017–2020	Hetty Feather	Agnes Duffett	Main role
2017	Will	Maid	Episode: "Your Houses"
2018	Strike	Kelsey Platt	2 episodes
2018	Shakespeare & Hathaway: Private Investigators	Lily Rattle	Episode: "The Chameleon's Dish"
2020	Heart to Heart	Liddy Holligan	Pilot; main role
2020	Casualty	Lily 'Bluebell' Matthews	Episode #34.33
2020	Black Beauty	Georgina Winthorp	Film
2021	Trying	Emmy	Episode: "Big Heads"

== Radio ==
Year	Title	Role	Station
2010	Devil in the Fog	Rose	BBC Radio 4
2011	Weirdstone of Brinsagem	Susan	BBC Radio 4
2016	Man at the Helm	Amy	BBC Radio 4
2016	Hidden Harm	Lucy	BBC Radio 4

== Stage ==
Year	Title	Role	Venue	Ref.
2011	Kin	Nina	Royal Court Theatre	
2011	Electra	Young Electra	Gate Theatre	
