= The Jetty (TV series) =

British Television series

- Genre: Crime drama
- Created by: Cat Jones
- Written by: Cat Jones
- Directed by: Marialy Rivas
- Starring: Jenna Coleman
- Country of origin: United Kingdom
- Original language: English
- No. of series: 1
- No. of episodes: 4

Production
- Executive producers: Elizabeth Kilgarriff; Sarah Wyatt; Cat Jones; Marialy Rivas; Jenna Coleman; Jo McClellan
- Producer: Natasha Romaniuk
- Running time: 57 minutes
- Production company: Firebird Pictures

Original release
- Network: BBC One
- Release: 15 July – 22 July 2024

The Jetty is a British crime drama television series, created and written by Cat Jones, directed by Marialy Rivas, and produced by Firebird Pictures. It stars Jenna Coleman. The series was released for streaming on 15 July 2024 on BBC iPlayer; it started broadcasting the same day on BBC One. The Jetty's four episodes were watched on average by over 6 million people, the equivalent of approximately 25 million streams, making it one of the most watched British TV shows of 2024 across all broadcasters and platforms.

== Synopsis ==
Detective Manning (Coleman) investigates a fire in a holiday home in a scenic Lancashire town and its connection to an old missing person case.

== Cast and characters ==
- Jenna Coleman as Ember Manning
  - Connie Jenkins-Greig as young Ember Manning
- Tom Glynn-Carney as Malachy "Mack" Granger, Ember's late husband
- Bo Bragason as Amy Knightly
- Laura Marcus as Caitlin "Kitty" Owen, Amy's friend
  - Lorna Nickson Brown as present Caitlin Owen
- Ruby Stokes as Hannah Granger, Ember's daughter
  - Effy Buckles Jones as young Hannah Granger
- Weruche Opia as Riz Samuel, a true crime podcaster
- Archie Renaux as Simon "Hitch" Hitchson, Ember's colleague
- Amelia Bullmore as Sylvia, Ember's mother
- Ralph Ineson as DI Morgan
- Dominic Coleman as Brad, a local suspect
- Niamh Blackshaw as Rosie, a podcast interviewee
- Philip Hill-Pearson as Rob, who works at the boat hut
- Elliot Cowan as Russell Knightly, Amy's father
- David Ajala as Casey, Ember's therapist
- Matthew McNulty as Arj, Malachy's best friend
  - Joshua Gannon as young Arj

=== Supporting ===
- Shannon Watson as Miranda Ashby, a pregnant teenager
- Georgina Rich as Sheena, Miranda's mother
- Arthur Hughes as Liam Ashby, Miranda's step-uncle
- Nina Barker-Francis as Chloe, Hannah's close friend
- Miya Ocego as Jules, Hannah's close friend
- Clare Calbraith as Joan Owen, Caitlin's mother
- Rick Warden as Martin, Caitlin's father
- Anna Wilson-Jones as Imogen, Amy's mother
- Eleanor Nawal as Lawley, Ember's colleague
- Adam Astill as Mr Ryan, who owns the boat hut
- Ruaridh Mollica as Troy, a boy from Hannah's school and her love interest
- Jonny Fines as Joe, half brother of Malachy
  - Ryan Dean as young Joe
- Peter Sullivan as Blake, a private detective
- Philip Whitchurch as Superintendent Needham, a retired detective
- Amer Nazir as Ali, a witness
- Natalie Gumede as Nina, a GP

== Production ==
Produced by Firebird Pictures, the series is set in Lancashire. In August 2023, Marialy Rivas was added to the project as director. Jones, Coleman and Rivas also act as executive producers alongside Elizabeth Kilgarriff, Sarah Wyatt and Jo McClellan. In November 2023, Ruby Stokes, Ralph Ineson and Amelia Bullmore were added to the cast.

=== Filming ===
Between September and December 2023, filming took place in Calderdale, West Yorkshire and Rochdale, Greater Manchester with filming locations including Ripponden, Littleborough, Sowerby Bridge and Todmorden. The lake is Hollingworth Lake, and the jetty was built on its south shore, near the Pavilion Café. Ember Manning's home is the lock keeper's house on the eastern edge of Todmorden, where Haugh Road crosses the Rochdale Canal.

== Episodes ==
No.	Title	Directed by	Written by	Original release date	UK viewers (millions)
1	"Beautiful Places"	Marialy Rivas	Cat Jones	15 July 2024	5.82
While investigating a fire on the jetty, detective Ember Manning witnesses a friend of her daughter's, Miranda Ashby, being pushed by a man. Further investigation reveals Ashby, who is sixteen, is pregnant. Before she can attempt further investigation Ashby throws herself out a window. Manning begins to suspect Ashby was involved with an older man and might have been statutorily raped. Riz, a podcaster investigating the disappearance of Amy Knightly, another young teen who went missing fifteen years earlier, causes Ember to begin to reflect on her own relationship with her husband, which started when she was a teenager. While going through her husband's things Ember discovers that her husband knew Amy Knightley.
2	"Naive Prey"	Marialy Rivas	Cat Jones	16 July 2024	4.56
Ember is reassured by friends and her own mother that her relationship with her husband was loving. She further learns that her husband was with her the night Amy went missing. No longer believing that her husband could have been involved with Amy, Ember begins to collaborate with Riz on investigating Amy's disappearance. Contacting Amy's parents again, Ember learns that despite initially claiming one date for Amy's disappearance and telling investigators she took her passport with her she actually left a few days earlier and her passport was found in the family home. Under pressure from the community because of Riz, the police dredge the lake near the jetty. They find a body but it belongs to Riz, not Amy.
3	"Angry not Mad"	Marialy Rivas	Cat Jones	21 July 2024	4.36
4	"Ghosts"	Marialy Rivas	Cat Jones	22 July 2024	4.15

== Reception ==
Lucy Mangan of The Guardian awarded the show four out of five stars, describing it as 'a dark, funny and moving look at how women navigate the brutally male world.'

Ben Dowell of The Times gave it four stars, calling it 'a thoughtful #MeToo thriller with a smart twist.'

Emily Baker of i newspaper also awarded four stars, finishing her review by saying: 'I can't remember the last time a BBC crime series gripped me this much.'

The Standard's Vicky Jessop awarded four stars and says that the series delivers 'a message that feels all too relevant today; the show doesn't offer any easy answers, but the end result is electric.'

Nick Hilton of The Independent gave it three out of five stars, describing it as 'a compulsive mystery that wears its politics confidently and opaquely.'
