= Decca: The Letters of Jessica Mitford =

- First edition
- Author: Jessica Mitford; Peter Y. Sussman (editor)
- Language: English
- Genre: Collection
- Publisher: Weidenfeld & Nicolson
- Publication date: 2006
- Publication place: United Kingdom
- Media type: Print (Hardback & Paperback)
- Pages: 768
- ISBN: 0-297-60745-6
- OCLC: 80901934
- Preceded by: The American Way of Death Revisited
- Followed by: The Mitfords: Letters Between Six Sisters

Decca: The Letters of Jessica Mitford is 2006 collection of letters by Jessica Mitford. The book was edited by Peter Y. Sussman and the publisher is Weidenfeld & Nicolson.

== Synopsis ==
The book includes Mitford's letters between 1924 leading up to her death in 1996. It chronicles her escape from family life and elopement with Esmond Romilly. Following Romilly's premature death, the letters document her subsequent marriage to Robert Treuhaft and her activism in the Civil rights movement, the American Communist Party and her exposés of the American funeral industry. As with her previous biography, Hons and Rebels, the letters also concentrate on her relationship with her sisters and friends in America and England.

== Reception ==
The book was generally well received by critics. Richard Eder of The New York Times called the letters "a treasure" and considered Mitford as "a happy warrior; in her letters, as in her books, she gets at her targets — the funeral directors, fat-farmers, prison establishment, writing programs — with their own words." J.K. Rowling, writing for The Telegraph, admitted Mitford had been her "heroine" and called Sussman's editing of the letters "masterful".

DJ Taylor called the book "absorbing" and Miranda Seymour of The Sunday Times wrote "Decca’s sense of humour flows through her correspondence as brightly and dangerously as a fencer’s rapier. Here is a book to be savoured and revisited: impure and undiluted pleasure, from start to finish."

Adam Kirsch of The New York Sun was less enthusiastic in his review and wrote "Reading these letters helps to make them, if not less maddening, at least more human. The humanity needs rescuing, because it has been encrusted by nearly 80 years' worth of mythmaking" and summed up the letters as "a reminder that of all the sisters' talents, the greatest was the talent for publicity." Daphne Merkin writing for Slate had mixed feelings, "These letters are rarely less than amusing, colored by a salubrious scorn for the pieties and deceit of the status quo and marked by Decca’s gimlet eye for the maliciously telling detail. All the same, it can become taxing to spend long periods of time in the company of someone playing so incessantly for laughs. Did Decca experience a moment of sadness, doubt, or vulnerability in her life?" However, Merkin concluded that "it’s impossible not to be drawn in by Decca’s spiky charm and disarming curiosity, which remained with her to the end."
