= 26 Rutland Gate =

House in Knightsbridge, London, England

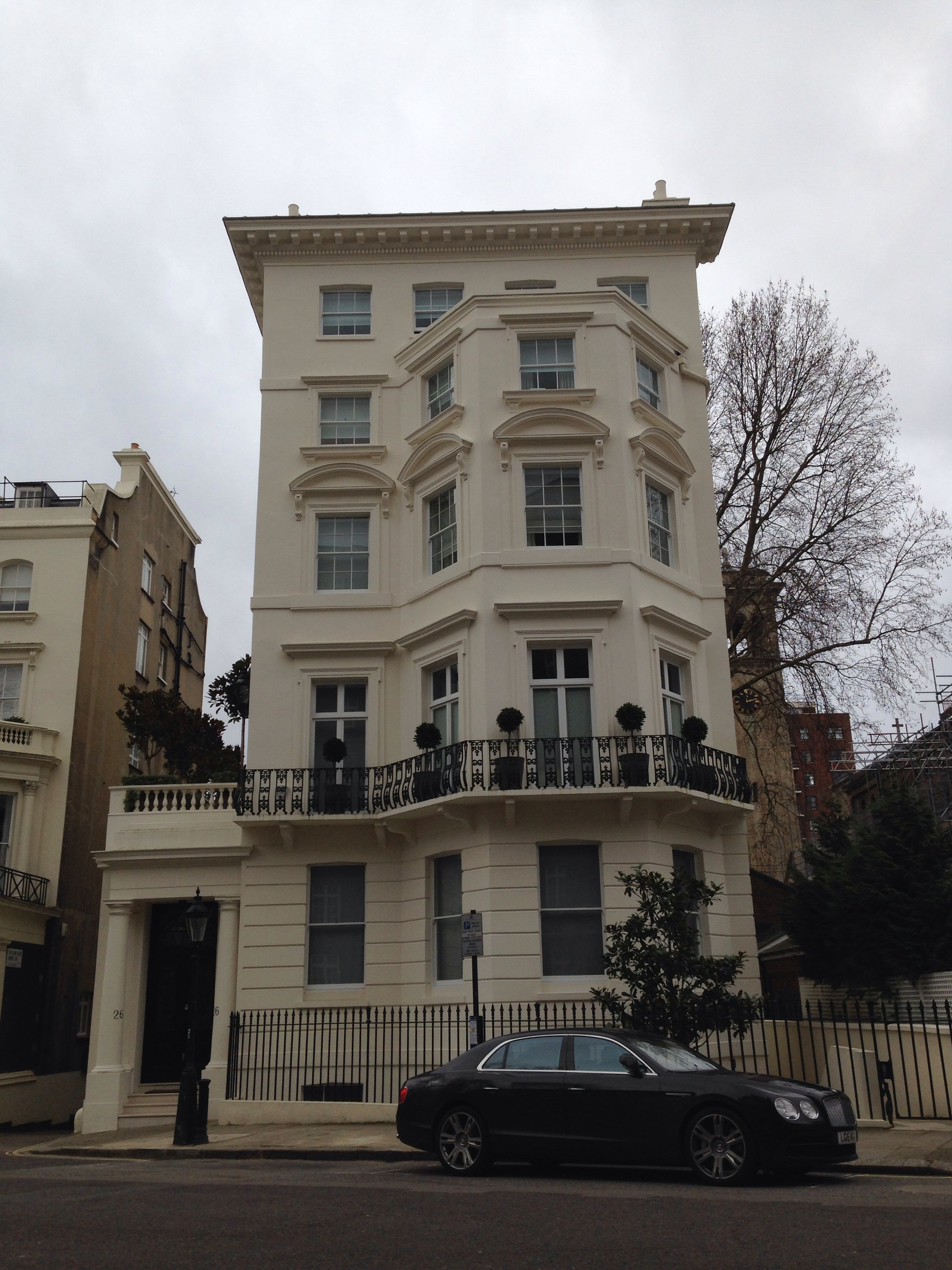
- The house in 2016

- Location within Greater London

General information
- Location: Knightsbridge, London, England
- Coordinates: 51°30′01″N 0°10′07″W
- Year built: 1846–47

Design and construction
- Main contractor: John Tombs

Listed Building – Grade II
- Official name: 26, Rutland Gate
- Designated: 10 August 2004
- Reference no.: 1390972

Listed Building – Grade II
- Official name: Lamp standard outside number 26
- Designated: 1 December 1987
- Reference no.: 1265117

26 Rutland Gate is a large, detached house on Rutland Gate in the Knightsbridge district of London SW7. The house is listed at Grade II, as is the 19th-century cast iron street light outside the house.

== Description ==
26 Rutland Gate is a four-storey, white-stuccoed house built by builder John Tombs in 1846–47. The National Heritage List for England describes the design of the house as "Four-bay front with four-storey canted bay window. Entrance in Tuscan closed porch with balustraded roof attached to south side. First-floor front bombé cast-iron balcony, French windows. Second-floor segmental pediments. Cornice lost. Return elevations altered." The house was listed due to its status as Rutland Gate's last surviving detached villa of the 1840s. The side of the house adjoins the cemetery of the Russian Orthodox cathedral on Ennismore Gardens.

== History ==
The house was not constructed for a specific client, but Tombs wrote that it would "be occupied by a family of the first respectability". The house was Tombs's last building at Rutland Gate and was first leased by a solicitor, Frederick Pratt Barlow. Barlow had previously been the initial occupant of 17 Rutland Gate.

In the 1920s and 1930s, the house was the London home during the Season of the Mitford family, who acquired the lease on the house for £28,000 after selling Asthall Manor, their country house in Oxfordshire. The Mitfords were forced to give up Rutland Gate in the midst of the Great Depression, and it was initially rented from them by the Earl of Elgin, and subsequently by an American woman, a Mrs Warren Pearl. Deborah Devonshire (née Mitford) later recalled in her 2010 memoir, Wait for Me!...Memoirs of the Youngest Mitford Sister, that her mother was annoyed by Pearl's "painting everything, including the floors, green". Jessica Mitford recalled Rutland Gate in her 1960 memoir, Hons and Rebels, describing the house as reflecting "comfort and serviceability rather than elegance". The house was later used by Nancy Mitford to house evacuees from the East End of London and Jewish refugees from Poland in the Second World War. After the war, it was inhabited by Patrick de László, the son of portrait painter Philip de László.

The house was acquired by the American businessman Richard Gangel in the 1960s. Gangel was the friend and business associate of Bernie Cornfield of Investors Overseas Service (IOS). Gangel turned the ballroom at 26 Rutland Gate into a cinema as part of what the Survey of London called a "Hollywood-style remodeling of the interior"; the survey also described the house as "attracting some attention for the extravagance of its decorations and fittings". The house was put up for sale for $1 million, then a record price for a property in London, following Gangel's bankruptcy after the collapse of IOS.
