= Dobby Walker =

American labor lawyer

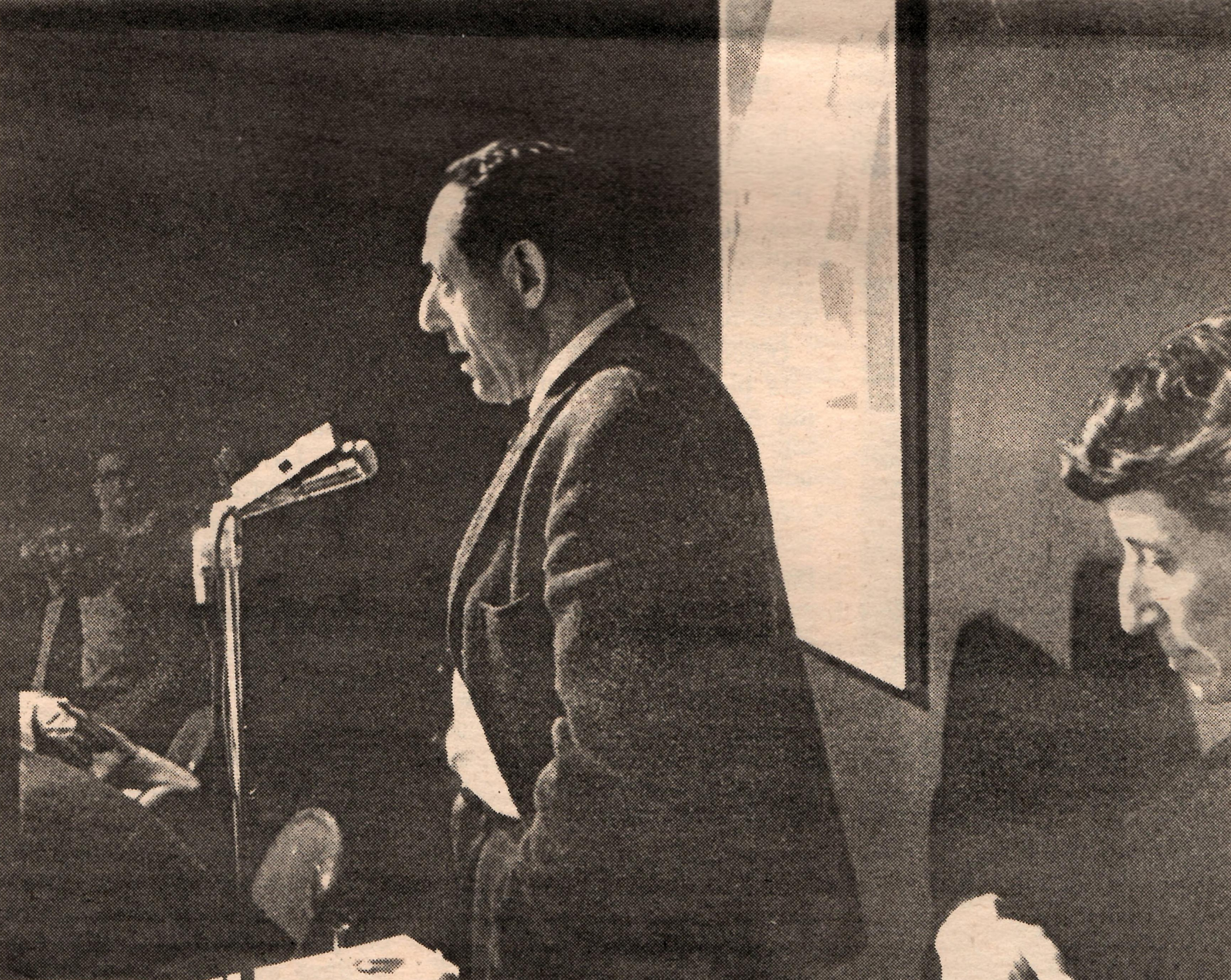
Walker (right) at a dinner in honor of Al Richmond (center) in Berkeley, California, March 7, 1970

Doris Brin "Dobby" Walker Roberson (April 20, 1919 - August 13, 2009) was an American labor lawyer and founding partner with Robert Treuhaft at the firm of Treuhaft, Walker and Burnstein.

== Background ==
Born in Dallas, Texas, in 1919, Walker graduated Phi Beta Kappa from the University of California, Los Angeles, and went on to UC Berkeley's law school, Boalt Hall. She joined the Communist Party USA whilst at UCLA in the late 1930s. The only woman in her class, Walker graduated from Boalt Hall in 1942.

Walker was close friends with the writer Jessica Mitford for years; Jessica was married to Robert Treuhaft, Doris' law partner. Doris invited Jessica and her husband to join the Communist Party, prompting the latter to reply "We thought you'd never ask!" There have been articles speculating that author J.K. Rowling, who considers Mitford her heroine, named her Harry Potter character Dobby the house elf after encountering the name Dobby in Mitford's works.

Walker was widowed in 1951, and remarried in 1952, thereby acquiring the additional surname "Roberson".

== Career ==
Walker was fired from her first law firm, which she attributed to her gender. In the mid-1940s she left legal practice and became a labor organizer in a series of canneries, being fired when her employers learned she was a Communist. From 1946 to 1949 she worked at Cutter Laboratories in San Francisco, becoming a union leader before being fired in 1949. A labor-management arbitration panel ordered her reinstated, on the grounds that Cutter had long known she was a Communist and improperly dismissed Walker for her union activity, but in a 4-3 ruling the California Supreme Court declared that a Communist had no right to a job, even under a union contract. In 1956, the case was heard at the US Supreme Court. The court rejected the case 8–3 on the grounds that there was no federal element, although a dissenting opinion considered it a First Amendment issue. This case has since been overruled, as the federal policy of deference to labor arbitration is regarded as preempting the field.

After being fired by Cutter Labs, Walker returned to legal practice, representing people charged under the 1940 Smith Act for the "crime" of being members of the Communist Party. In the 1950s Walker represented individuals subpoenaed before the House Un-American Activities Committee, and in 1953 appeared before the committee herself, declining to answer any questions on a number of grounds, including that constitutionally the congressional committee was only entitled to act in a legislative capacity, and it was evident that it was seeking to act in a judicial capacity.

From 1956 to 1961, Walker provided "virtually pro-bono" defense of journalist John W. Powell, who was prosecuted for reporting that the United States biological weapons program had been actively employed during the Korean War.

In 1961 Walker was a founding partner, with Robert Treuhaft, at the firm of Treuhaft, Walker and Burnstein. She remained a partner until 1977. In 1971 and 1972 Walker played a key role in the defense of Angela Davis in her historic California murder, kidnapping, and conspiracy trial in which Davis faced the death penalty. The defense pioneered use of the media and jury consultants. Future Secretary of State Hillary Clinton was then an intern at Treuhaft, Walker, and Burnstein, during the summer of 1971.

In 1970, Walker was elected the first woman president of the National Lawyers Guild. Walker remained active in her 80s as a guild lawyer in the San Francisco Bay chapter on the Labor & Employment Committee and the State Bar Committee, and was an East Bay leader in the Gray Panthers.

In 1996 Walker was one of eight international observers at South Africa's Truth and Reconciliation Commission.

In spring of 2004, Walker submitted on behalf of the National Lawyers Guild Bay Area Chapter to the Conference of Delegates of California Bar Association asking the California Congressional Delegation to investigate representations by the Bush administration used to justify the war in Iraq for possible impeachment. The resolution follows:

Resolved, that the Conference of Delegates of California Bar Associations urges California Congressional Delegation to commence a Congressional investigation of representations by George Bush, Dick Cheney, and the Bush Administration, used to justify war on Iraq and Afghanistan to Congress, the United Nations and to the people of the U.S. and the world, without a formal request for Congress to declare war.
