= David Freeman-Mitford, 2nd Baron Redesdale =

English peer and landowner (1878–1958)

The Right Honourable The Lord Redesdale JP
- Redesdale in 1933

Member of the House of Lords
- Lord Temporal
- In office 17 August 1916 – 17 March 1958
- Preceded by: The 1st Baron Redesdale
- Succeeded by: The 3rd Baron Redesdale

Personal details
- Born: David Bertram Ogilvy Mitford; 13 March 1878 Chelsea, London, England
- Died: 17 March 1958 (aged 80) Otterburn, Northumberland, England
- Spouse: Sydney Bowles (m. 1904)
- Children: Nancy, Pamela, Thomas, Diana, Unity, Jessica, and Deborah
- Parent(s): Bertram Freeman-Mitford, 1st Baron Redesdale; Lady Clementine Ogilvy
- Education: Radley College

Military service
- Allegiance: United Kingdom
- Branch/service: Northumberland Fusiliers; Royal Air Force
- Rank: Captain
- Battles/wars: Second Boer War; World War I • Second Battle of Ypres

David Bertram Ogilvy Freeman-Mitford, 2nd Baron Redesdale (13 March 1878 – 17 March 1958), was a British peer, soldier, and landowner. He was the father of the Mitford sisters, in whose various novels and memoirs he is depicted.

== Ancestry and early life ==
The Mitfords were a family of the landed gentry, originally from Northumberland, whose history dates back to the 14th century. Redesdale's great-great-grandfather was the historian William Mitford. Redesdale was the second son of (Algernon) Bertram Freeman-Mitford, 1st Baron Redesdale, and his wife, Lady Clementine Gertrude Helen Ogilvy, daughter of David Ogilvy, 10th Earl of Airlie. His father was a diplomat, politician and author, with large inherited estates in Gloucestershire, Oxfordshire, and Northumberland. He was raised to the peerage in 1902, and so his son became known as the Hon. David Mitford, as the family commonly used the surname 'Mitford' by itself, and not the full 'Freeman-Mitford'.

Mitford's legendary eccentricity was evident from an early age. As a child, he was prone to sudden fits of rage. He was totally uninterested in reading and education and wished only to spend his time riding. He later liked to boast that he had read only one book in his life, Jack London's novel White Fang, on the grounds that he had enjoyed it so much he had vowed never to read another. He did, however, read most of his daughters' books.

His lack of academic aptitude meant that he was not sent to Eton, with his older brother, but rather to Radley, with the intention that he should enter the army. However, he failed the entrance examination to the Royal Military College, Sandhurst, and was instead sent to Ceylon to work for a tea planter.

== Work and war ==
In early 1900, he returned to England from Ceylon, and on 23 May 1900 he joined the Northumberland Fusiliers as a second lieutenant. His battalion served in the Second Boer War in South Africa, where Mitford soon joined in the fighting, in which he served with distinction and was wounded three times, losing one lung. He was briefly taken prisoner by the Boers in June 1900 but escaped. In May 1901 he was appointed aide-de-camp to Lord Methuen, a senior commander during the war, and on 10 August 1901 he was promoted to lieutenant. He was seconded to serve with the 40th (Oxfordshire) Company of the Imperial Yeomanry, and returned to the United Kingdom in April 1902. After his return, he was back as a regular lieutenant in his regiment in July 1902, but resigned from the army three months later, in October 1902.

In February 1904, Mitford married Sydney Bowles (1880–1963), whom he had first met ten years previously, when he was 16 and she was 14. She was the daughter of Thomas Gibson Bowles, a journalist and Conservative MP, who in 1863 had founded the magazine Vanity Fair, and some years later the women's magazine The Lady. For a time his father-in-law employed him as manager of The Lady, but Mitford showed no interest in, or talent for, this work. The Mitfords travelled regularly to Canada, where Mitford owned a gold claim near Swastika, Ontario: no gold was ever found there, but he enjoyed the outdoor life. His daughter Unity Mitford stated that she was conceived in Swastika and shared this fact with Hitler upon becoming one of his British confidants.

On the outbreak of the First World War in 1914, Mitford rejoined the Northumberland Fusiliers. He was commissioned as a lieutenant and served as a logistics officer in Flanders, being mentioned in despatches for his bravery at the Second Battle of Ypres (although there is no available record of this), where his elder brother Clement was killed. With only one lung and by now a captain he was invalided out of active service in 1916.

After his father's death in August 1916, being now Lord Redesdale, he was briefly appointed Provost Marshal for Oxfordshire, with responsibility for ensuring the enlistment of new recruits. In 1918–19 he served as a ground officer with the Royal Air Force.

As Lord Redesdale, he was often silent in the House of Lords, but joined the House of Lords Select Committee on Peerages in Abeyance in 1925.

Although Redesdale was now a large landowner, he was not a wealthy man: the estates were poorly developed and rents were low. With seven children to feed and five servants to pay, he could not maintain the expense of his large home at Batsford in the Cotswolds. He bought and extended Asthall Manor and then moved to nearby Swinbrook. Here he indulged his passion for building by building a new large house, named after the village, which appears as the family home in the books of his daughters Nancy and Jessica. The expense of these moves nearly ruined Redesdale, who was a poor manager of money. This, plus his increasing disappointment that all his later children were girls, led to the deterioration of his temperament which became legendary through his daughters' portrayals of his frequent and terrible rages.

=== Political views and family splits ===
As a Conservative peer, Redesdale was a hereditary member of the House of Lords. He attended sessions conscientiously but had little interest in legislation except for being opposed to nearly all progressive changes. In the 1930s, however, his wife developed a strong sympathy for fascism, and he favoured Neville Chamberlain's appeasement approach towards Nazi Germany. His daughter Jessica, a communist from her teenage years, described him as "one of nature's fascists", but he never joined any fascist party. As a result, he became permanently estranged from Jessica and partly estranged from his eldest daughter Nancy, who was a strong antifascist and moderate socialist – but not as left-wing as Jessica.

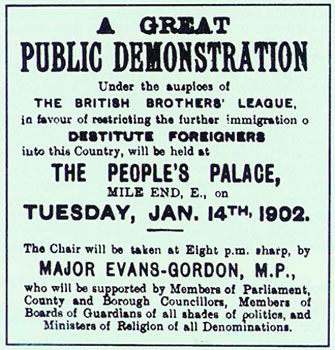
Notice of a demonstration organised by the British Brothers' League

The father of his wife Sydney, Thomas Gibson Bowles, had been one of the strongest parliamentary supporters of the Royal Navy while he was an MP, and her maternal uncle William Evans-Gordon was a retired British Indian Army officer who was opposed to uncontrolled immigration into Britain, was allied to the British Brothers' League, and helped to enact the Aliens Act 1905.

Redesdale was an instinctive xenophobe, and came back from the First World War with a dislike of the French and a deep hatred of the Germans. As "Uncle Matthew", who was modelled on Redesdale, put it in his daughter Nancy's 1945 novel The Pursuit of Love: "Frogs are slightly better than Huns or Wops, but abroad is unutterably bloody and foreigners are fiends." He was widely quoted as saying, "Abroad is bloody." In a Lords debate in 1971 Lord Gowrie recalled the words of: '… a former Lord Redesdale: "Abroad is bloody, and foreigners are fiends".'

He was initially scornful of the enthusiasm shown by his daughters Diana (wife of British Union of Fascists leader Oswald Mosley) and Unity for Nazi Germany and Adolf Hitler. However, pro-German sympathies emerged from the mid-1930s.

In 1937 and 1938, Lord and Lady Redesdale attended the annual Nuremberg rallies (German: Parteitage) as guests of the German Nazi Party. (Note: The 1937 Nuremberg Rally (German: Reichsparteitag der Arbeit) took place between 6 and 13 September 1937. The 1938 Nuremberg Rally (German: Reichsparteitag Großdeutschland) took place between 5 and 12 September 1938.) In 1938, the Redesdales accompanied their daughters to Germany, where they met Hitler, with whom Unity and Diana were already acquainted. Both the Redesdales were immediately won over by Hitler's charm and by his admiration for the British Empire.

Redesdale spoke in the House of Lords in favour of the Anschluss of Austria and of returning Germany's colonies, and he became an even stronger supporter of Chamberlain's policy of appeasement towards Germany. Lady Redesdale went further, writing articles in praise of Hitler and in support of National Socialism.

The outbreak of the Second World War in 1939 precipitated a series of crises in the Mitford family. Redesdale was, above all, a patriot, and as soon as war was declared by Chamberlain he recanted his support for Hitler and once again became violently anti-German. He explained his views in The Times in 1940:

My only crime, if it be a crime, so far as I know, is that I was one of many thousands in this country who thought that our best interests would be served by a friendly understanding with Germany. In this, though now proved to be wrong, I was at any rate in good company. ... certainly today my only desire is to see the earliest possible victory for the Allies... I am not, never have been, and am not likely to become a fascist.

Lady Redesdale stuck to her pro-Nazi sympathies; as a result, the pair became estranged, separating in 1943. Unity, who was in love with Hitler, attempted suicide in Munich on 3 September 1939 (the day Britain declared war on Germany), and suffered severe brain damage. She was brought home an invalid, and Lady Redesdale cared for her until Unity's death in 1948. Diana and Oswald Mosley were interned in May 1940 as security risks, and spent over three years in prison until their release in November 1943. Jessica's husband, Esmond Romilly, was lost with his aircraft over the North Sea during a raid on Germany in 1941; this deepened her bitterness towards the "fascist branch" of the family. Jessica never spoke to her father again, although she was reconciled with her mother in the 1950s. Jessica did not speak to Diana again until 1973, although they remained permanently estranged because of their continuing strong political differences.

== Children ==
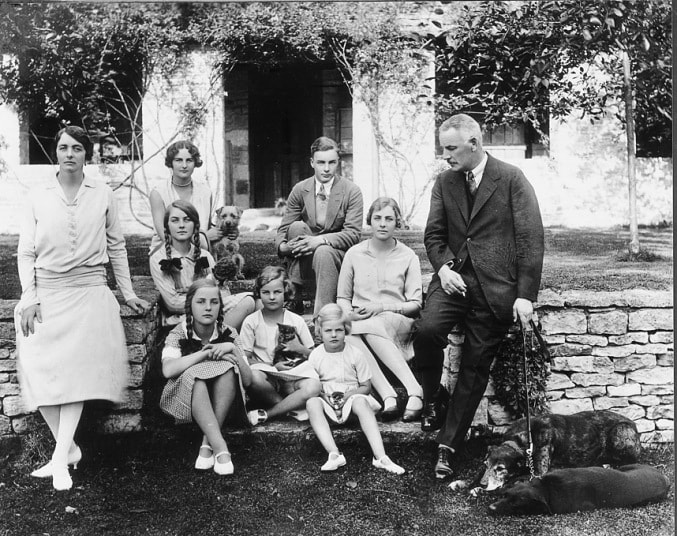
The Mitford family in 1928

Redesdale and his wife had one son and six daughters, who all used the surname Mitford rather than Freeman-Mitford:

- Hon. Nancy Mitford (1904–1973), who married the Hon. Peter Rodd. They divorced in 1957.
- Hon. Pamela Mitford (1907–1994), who married Derek Jackson, a physicist and the son of Sir Charles Jackson
- Hon. Major Thomas David Mitford (1909–1945), who was killed in action in Burma
- Hon. Diana Mitford (1910–2003), who married Bryan Guinness in 1929. They divorced in 1933 and she then married Sir Oswald Mosley in 1936.
- Hon. Unity Valkyrie Mitford (1914–1948), who befriended Adolf Hitler before the war
- Hon. Jessica Lucy Mitford (1917–1996), who married Esmond Romilly, an anti-fascist, in 1937. After his death in 1941, she married Robert Treuhaft, an American lawyer, in 1943.
- Hon. Deborah Vivien Mitford (1920–2014), who married Andrew Cavendish, Marquess of Hartington, the younger son and eventual heir of the 10th Duke of Devonshire, in 1941

For Nancy's birth certificate, her father stated his occupation as: "Honourable."

== Later life ==
In 1945, his son Tom was killed in action in Burma, a blow from which Lord Redesdale, already depressed by the break-up of his marriage, never recovered. According to Nancy Mitford's biographer: "Although she [Nancy] was deeply grieved by his death, it did not mean for her, as it did for her parents, that all pleasure in life was over."

Redesdale retreated to Inch Kenneth, an island in the Inner Hebrides off the west coast of Scotland, which he had purchased in 1938. Later he moved to Redesdale Cottage, near Otterburn, Northumberland, his family's ancestral property, and lived there as a virtual recluse.

By 1950, when Nancy visited him, he was "frail and old". He died aged 80 in Northumberland in 1958, and was buried in the graveyard of St Mary's Church in Swinbrook, Oxfordshire, where four of his daughters (Nancy, Diana, Unity and Pamela) were also later buried.

His title passed to his brother Bertram, who became the 3rd Baron Redesdale.

== In fiction as "Uncle Matthew" ==
Redesdale is the model for Uncle Matthew, Lord Alconleigh of Alconleigh, in Nancy's novels The Pursuit of Love (1945) and Love in a Cold Climate (1949). In a typical passage from the former: "As soon as breakfast was over, he would begin striding about the hall, bellowing at the dogs 'Come here, blast you! Get off that coat!' Kick. 'Stop that noise, blast you!' – shouting for his loader [gun], damning and blasting anyone rash enough to cross his path." He would keep his bloodhounds in practice by having them track his children. Uncle Matthew also kept a wartime entrenching tool on a chimneypiece that still had an enemy's hair and brain parts on it. Nevertheless, both daughters' accounts make it clear that between rages, Redesdale was an indulgent father who loved riding and hunting with his children.

Uncle Matthew was played by Michael Aldridge in the 1980 Thames Television series Love in a Cold Climate. He was played by Alan Bates in the BBC production of Love in a Cold Climate. He was played by Dominic West in the 2021 BBC miniseries The Pursuit of Love. In Outrageous (2025) Redesdale was played by James Purefoy.

== Notes ==
Peerage of the United Kingdom
Preceded by Bertram Freeman-Mitford	Baron Redesdale; 2nd creation 1916–1958; Member of the House of Lords (1916–1958)	Succeeded by Bertram Freeman-Mitford
