= The Mitfords: Letters Between Six Sisters =

2007 book of selected letters between the Mitford sisters

- First edition
- Author: Charlotte Mosley (editor); Deborah Mitford; Diana Mitford; Jessica Mitford; Nancy Mitford; Unity Mitford; Pamela Mitford
- Language: English
- Genre: Anthology
- Publisher: HarperCollins
- Publication date: 2007
- Publication place: United Kingdom
- Media type: Hardback and paperback
- Pages: 834
- ISBN: 0-06-137364-8
- OCLC: 148887247

The Mitfords: Letters Between Six Sisters is a 2007 book of selected letters between the Mitford sisters. It contains letters exchanged between Nancy Mitford, Pamela Mitford, Diana Mitford, Unity Mitford, Jessica Mitford and Deborah Mitford between 1925 and 2003. The book was edited by Diana Mitford's daughter-in-law, Charlotte Mosley. An estimated five percent of 12,000 surviving letters between the six sisters were included in the 834-page publication. The book was published by HarperCollins.

== Reception ==
The book was well received both critically and commercially. In particular previously held perceptions were challenged. India Knight wrote in the Sunday Times; "we didn't really know them especially well, it turns out. Jessica was not that good; Diana briefly sinister but also clever, kind, fatally loyal to her Blackshirt husband, Oswald Mosley, and so on." The book was serialized by The Washington Post.

== Format ==
The book is divided into nine chapters according to a time. Each chapter of letters is preceded by an introduction explaining the context, written by the editor.

- Chapter 1 (1925–1933)
- Chapter 2 (1933–1939)
- Chapter 3 (1939–1945)
- Chapter 4 (1945–1949)
- Chapter 5 (1950–1959)
- Chapter 6 (1960–1966)
- Chapter 7 (1967–1973)
- Chapter 8 (1974–1994)
- Chapter 9 (1995–2003)

== See also ==
- Hons and Rebels
