= The Loved One (book) =

1948 novel by Evelyn Waugh

- First edition (UK)
- Author: Evelyn Waugh
- Illustrator: Stuart Boyle
- Language: English
- Genre: Satirical, Novel
- Publisher: Little, Brown (USA) & Chapman & Hall (UK)
- Publication date: February 1948
- Publication place: United Kingdom
- Media type: Print (hardback & paperback)
- OCLC: 26887851

The Loved One: An Anglo-American Tragedy is a short satirical novel published in 1948 by British novelist Evelyn Waugh about the funeral business in Los Angeles, the British expatriate community in Hollywood, and the film industry.

== Conception ==
The Loved One was written as a result of Evelyn Waugh's trip to Hollywood in February and March 1947. MGM was interested in adapting Waugh's novel Brideshead Revisited (1945). Waugh had written that, "I should not think six Americans will understand it" and was baffled and even angered by its popularity in America, referring to it as "my humiliating success in [the] U.S.A."

Waugh had no intention of allowing MGM to adapt Brideshead Revisited, but allowed the film studio to bring him and his wife to California and pay him $2,000 a week during negotiations. MGM was offering $140,000 if he granted them the film rights but Waugh was careful to ensure that the weekly stipend was paid regardless of the results of the negotiation. Waugh was negotiating with MGM producer Leon Gordon, a British playwright and screenwriter and British screenwriter Keith Winter, whom Waugh had known in Europe, who was to write the adaptation. Waugh complained that Winter "sees Brideshead purely as a love story" and that no one at MGM was able to grasp the "theological implication" of the novel. MGM abandoned its pursuit of the novel after Waugh explained to Gordon "what Brideshead was about" and he seemed to "lose heart", citing aspects highlighted by the censor.

In Hollywood, Waugh enjoyed meeting Charlie Chaplin and Walt Disney ("the two artists of the place") but complained about the accommodations, the quality of food and the lack of wine at meals, the relaxed dress and informal manners and the small talk of service workers – "the exact opposite of the English custom by which the upper classes are expected to ask personal questions of the lower". His trip to Hollywood was successful in a literary way. He wrote "I found a deep mine of literary gold in the cemetery of Forest Lawn and the work of the morticians and intend to get to work immediately on a novelette staged there." Forest Lawn's founder, Dr. Hubert Eaton, and his staff gave Waugh tours of the facility and introduced him to their field. Waugh also had a copy of Eaton's book, Embalming Techniques, which Waugh annotated with marginalia. As Waugh felt that the eschatological or apocalyptic implications he had intended in Brideshead Revisited had escaped many American readers, he was determined to highlight eschatological aspects of American society in The Loved One.

== Plot ==
Sir Ambrose Abercrombie visits housemates Dennis Barlow and Sir Francis Hinsley to express his concern about Barlow's new job and how it reflects on the British enclave in Hollywood, which is also taken as an announcement of Barlow's impending exclusion from British society. Barlow reports to his job at the Happier Hunting Ground, a pet cemetery and funeral service, and picks up a couple's dead Sealyham Terrier.

Because of the difficulty he is having rebranding actress Juanita del Pablo as an Irish starlet (having previously rebranded Baby Aaronson as del Pablo), Hinsley is sent to work from home. After his secretary stops showing up, he ventures to Megalopolitan Studios and finds a man named Lorenzo Medici in his office. After working his way through the bureaucracy he finds he has been unceremoniously fired. In the next scene, Abercrombie and other British expatriates are discussing Hinsley's suicide and the funeral arrangements.

Barlow, given the task of making Hinsley's funeral arrangements, visits Whispering Glades. There he is transfixed by the cosmetician Aimée Thanatogenos, though he has yet to learn her name.

Barlow continues with the funeral arrangements while Hinsley's body arrives at Whispering Glades and is tended to by Thanatogenos and the senior mortician Mr. Joyboy.

Barlow visits Whispering Glades seeking inspiration for Hinsley's funeral ode. While touring a British-themed section of the cemetery, he meets Thanatogenos and begins his courtship of her when she learns he is a poet.

Six weeks later, Thanatogenos is torn between her very different affections for Barlow and Joyboy. She writes to the advice columnist "The Guru Brahmin" for advice. Joyboy invites her over for dinner and she meets his mother.

The office of the Guru Brahmin consists of "two gloomy men and a bright young secretary". Tasked with responding to Thanatogenos' letters is Mr. Slump, a grim drunk who advises that she marry Joyboy. She instead decides to marry Barlow.

Joyboy learns that the poems which Barlow has been using to woo Thanatogenos are not his own, and arranges that Thanatogenos, who still does not know Barlow works for a pet cemetery, attend the funeral of his mother's parrot at the Happier Hunting Ground.

Sometime after Thanatogenos' discovery of Barlow's deceptions, Barlow reads the announcement of her engagement to Joyboy. Barlow meets her and she is again torn between the two men. She tracks down Mr. Slump to seek the advice of the Guru Brahmin and finds him, via telephone, in a bar after he has been fired. Slump tells her to jump off a building. She commits suicide by injecting herself with embalming fluid in Joyboy's workroom at Whispering Glades.

Joyboy discovers Thanatogenos' body and seeks assistance from Barlow. Then Barlow meets Abercrombie, who, fearing Barlow's plans to become a non-sectarian funeral pastor will further damage the image of the British enclave, pays his return passage to England. Joyboy returns, unaware of Barlow's impending departure, and in exchange for all his savings, Barlow says he will leave town so it will appear that he ran away with Thanatogenos. After cremating the body, Barlow registers Joyboy for the Happier Hunting Ground annual postcard service so every year Joyboy will receive a card reading "Your little Aimée is wagging her tail in heaven tonight, thinking of you."

== Characters ==
Dennis Barlow, a celebrated 28-year-old British poet who is brought to Hollywood to write a script for a film biography of Percy Bysshe Shelley. He is fired from his job and, as the novel opens, he is working for the Happier Hunting Ground, a funeral service for pets. He frequently quotes lines of poetry in his speech and writing, especially when he is wooing Aimée Thanatogenos, whom he allows to believe he is the author of those lines. The sources include Alfred Tennyson, Edgar Allan Poe, and others. One quotation, from the poet Richard Middleton, was not publicly identified until 1981, 33 years after the publication of The Loved One.

Aimée Thanatogenos, a cosmetician at Whispering Glades. She was named after evangelist Aimee Semple McPherson. Her first name is French for "loved one" while her last name is Greek for "born of death". Waugh describes her eyes as "greenish and remote, with a rich glint of lunacy."

Mr. Joyboy, senior mortician at Whispering Glades. His trademark is a beaming smile he leaves on the faces of embalmed bodies. He lives with his mother, Mrs. Joyboy, and is dominated by her.

Sir Francis Hinsley, Barlow's Hollywood housemate. In his youth, Hinsley authored the widely acclaimed novel A Free Man Greets the Dawn, but has long since abandoned writing. Former chief scriptwriter for Megalopolitan Pictures, as the novel opens he works for their publicity department and is struggling with rebranding an actress named Juanita del Pablo into an Irish starlet. He is fired from Megalopolitan and hangs himself.

Sir Ambrose Abercrombie, a distinguished British actor and leader of the British enclave in Hollywood, is primarily concerned to maintain the image of his country in the eyes of Hollywood. It is believed that he is based on actor Sir C. Aubrey Smith.

== Publication and reception ==
Waugh began writing The Loved One in May 1947. After initial "very slow" going, he finished the first draft in early July and completed the novel in September. It was published in its entirety by Cyril Connolly in the February 1948 issue of Horizon. (Hinsley is described reading a copy of Horizon in the opening chapter of The Loved One.) It was enthusiastically greeted by readers who thought Waugh had returned to early form with this short comic novel.

The novel was successfully published in America as well, though Waugh had feared lawsuits so much that he employed his friend Lord Stanley of Alderley to add a codicil to his will instructing that he be buried at Forest Lawn. Waugh also claimed that American morticians would refuse to service his body should he die in the US. The novel was well-reviewed, however, and sales were good.

The New Yorker, though, refused to publish the novel because they thought the themes of the novel had already been well-handled by American authors, such as S. J. Perelman, Sinclair Lewis, and Nathanael West, the latter of whom had written two novels on themes (Hollywood studios and advice columnists) Waugh tackled in The Loved One. The magazine wrote "The freshest part of Mr. Waugh's story is the part which refers to the English in Hollywood, and we wish, wistfully, that he had concerned himself more exclusively with that theme."

== Allusions in other works ==
Tom Paxton mentions The Loved One, along with Jessica Mitford's book The American Way of Death, as one of the inspirations for his satirical song "Forest Lawn".

The 1985 Doctor Who serial Revelation of the Daleks is loosely based on the plot of the novel.

== Adaptations ==
The book was adapted in 1965 by Terry Southern and Christopher Isherwood into a film of the same title, which features, while adding to the novel's plot with new characters and scenes, many in-joke cameos and familiar California filming locations such as the Greystone Mansion. Isherwood himself can be glimpsed within the film as one of 'Uncle Frank's' mourners.

BBC Radio 4 broadcast a three-part audio adaptation in 1990, starring Rupert Graves and Miranda Richardson. It was repeated on BBC Radio 4 Extra in 2026, as part of programming to mark the sixtieth anniversary of Waugh's death.
