= Hons and Rebels =

1960 book by Jessica Mitford

- First edition
- Author: Jessica Mitford
- Language: English
- Genre: Autobiography
- Publisher: Gollancz
- Publication date: 1960
- Publication place: United Kingdom
- Media type: Print (Hardback & Paperback)
- Pages: 222
- OCLC: 37137955
- Followed by: The American Way of Death

Hons and Rebels, originally published in the United States under the title Daughters and Rebels, is a 1960 autobiography by political activist Jessica Mitford, which describes her aristocratic childhood and the conflicts between her and her sisters Unity and Diana, who were ardent supporters of Nazism.

Jessica was a supporter of Communism and eloped with her second cousin, Esmond Romilly, to fight with the Loyalists in the Spanish Civil War. Diana grew up to marry Sir Oswald Mosley, the leader of the British Union of Fascists. Unity befriended Nazi leader Hitler, who praised her as an ideal of Aryan beauty.

Mitford recalls:

"In the windows, still to be seen, are swastikas carved into the glass with a diamond ring, and for every swastika a carefully delineated hammer and sickle. They were put there by my sister Unity and myself when we were children. Hanging on the walls are framed pictures and poems done by Unity when she was quite small—queer, imaginative, interesting work, some on a tiny scale of microscopic detail, some huge and magnificent. The Hons' Cupboard, where Debo and I spent much of our time, still has the same distinctive, stuffy smell and enchanting promise of complete privacy from the Grown-ups."

Mitford and Hons and Rebels are cited by J. K. Rowling and Christopher Hitchens as great influences.

== See also ==
- Asthall Manor – the Mitfords' childhood home
