= The American Way of Death =

1963 Jessica Mitford book about funeral practices

- Cover of the first edition
- Author: Jessica Mitford
- Language: English
- Publisher: Simon & Schuster
- Publication date: 1963
- Publication place: United States
- Media type: Print (Hardback & Paperback)
- Pages: 238
- ISBN: 9780449239858
- OCLC: 491426
- Preceded by: Hons and Rebels
- Followed by: The Trial of Dr. Spock, the Rev. William Sloane Coffin, Jr., Michael Ferber, Mitchel Goodman, and Marcus Raskin

The American Way of Death is an exposé of abuses in the funeral home industry in the United States, written by Jessica Mitford and published in 1963. An updated revision, The American Way of Death Revisited, largely completed by Mitford just before her death in 1996, appeared in 1998.

== Overview ==
Mitford's husband, civil rights lawyer Robert Treuhaft, persuaded her to write an investigative article about the American funeral industry. Although her article on the subject, "Saint Peter Don't You Call Me", published in Frontier magazine, was not widely disseminated, it caught considerable attention when Mitford appeared on a local television broadcast with two industry representatives. Convinced of public interest, she wrote The American Way of Death, which was published in 1963. In the book Mitford harshly criticized the industry for using unscrupulous business practices to take advantage of grieving families.

Feeling that death had become much too sentimentalized, highly commercialized, and, above all, excessively expensive, Mitford published her research, which, she argues, documents the ways in which funeral directors took advantage of the shock and grief of loved ones' friends and relatives to convince them to pay far more than necessary for the funeral and other related services, such as availability of so-called "grief counselors", a title she claimed was unmerited. The book became a major bestseller and led to Congressional hearings on the funeral industry. It was one of the inspirations for the Tony Richardson film The Loved One (1965), which was based on the Evelyn Waugh short satirical novel The Loved One (1948), tellingly subtitled "An Anglo-American Tragedy".

In keeping with her wishes, Mitford herself had an inexpensive funeral, which cost a total of US$533.31 (equivalent to $1,095 in 2025). She was cremated without a ceremony, and the ashes scattered at sea; the cremation alone cost US$475 (equivalent to $975 in 2025). The funeral company was the Pacific Interment Service, which prides itself on "dignity, simplicity, affordability".

== Reception ==
Judith Newman in the New York Times Book Review commented:

This revised and updated version of her book is no less startling, or entertaining, than the original was...[Mitford] is also prescient in predicting the rise of bottom-line-above-all corporate funeral home chains like Service Corporation International and the Loewen Group, which, as Mitford reports, are now consolidating (read: devouring) mom-and-pop operations.

Bess Lovejoy of Lapham's Quarterly wrote in an extended review of the 1998 updated revision:

The book is a narrowly conceived exposé, a screed against expensive funerals and the men who sell them, not an analysis of how or why funerals got that way. It's interesting to contrast Mitford’s book with the seminal death texts of the past, such as the two in the fifteenth century that were both called The Art of Dying, or the Tibetan and Egyptian books of the dead. Those works helped individuals prepare for death by prescribing a series of attitudes and rituals designed to ensure a good death and a better afterlife. Such rituals helped people grapple with death’s great challenge to the self; they made death mean. By contrast, Mitford's book is a Consumer Reports of death.

== Popular culture ==
The book was referenced in the seventh and final season episode of Mad Men entitled "Field Trip" (2014-04-27, S07E03), where a character quips: "We can all learn something from the funeral business."
