= Deborah Cavendish, Duchess of Devonshire =

English aristocrat and writer (1920–2014)

Her Grace The Duchess of Devonshire DCVO
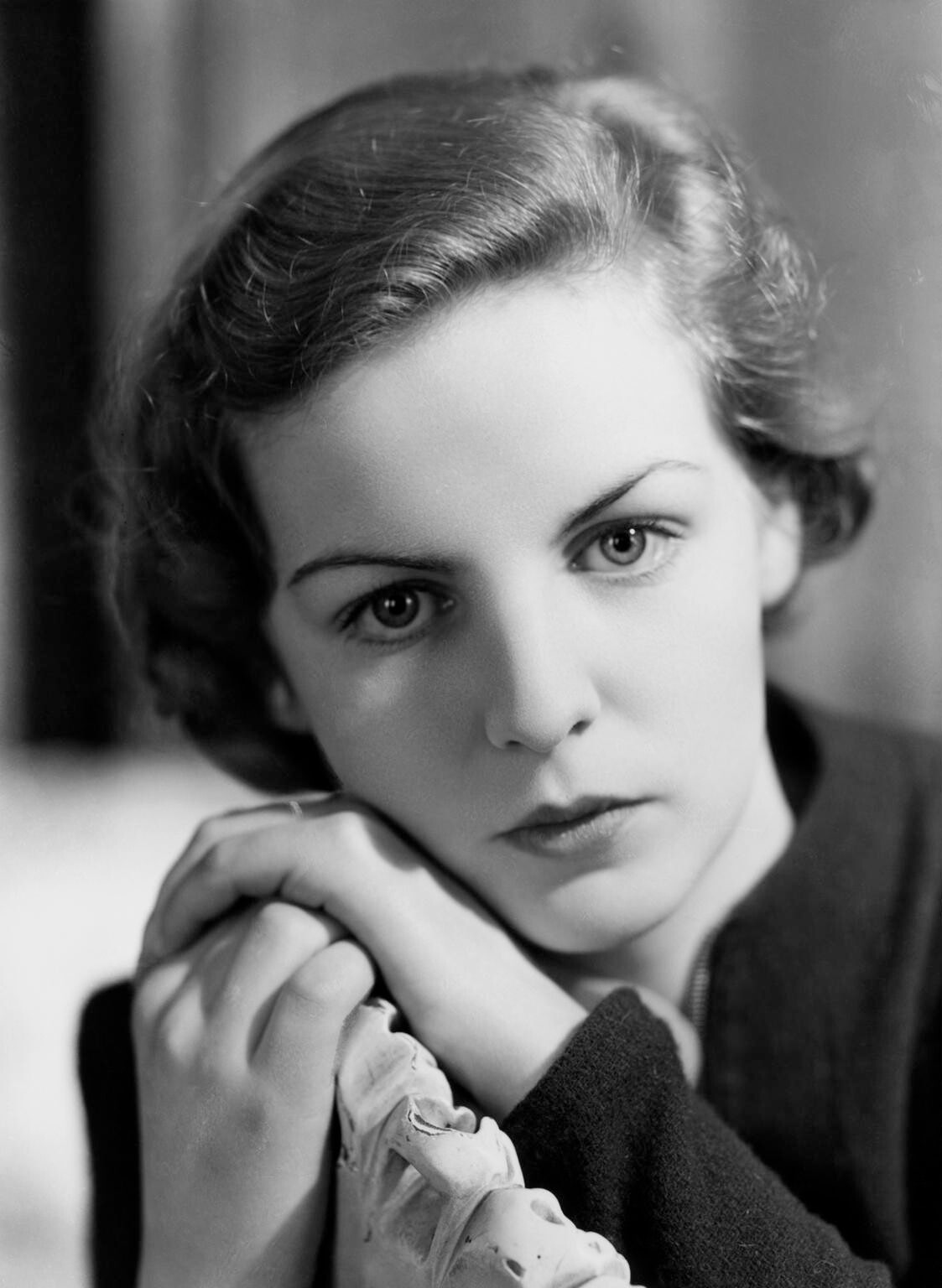
- Deborah Mitford in 1938
- Born: Deborah Vivien Freeman-Mitford; 31 March 1920; London, England
- Died: 24 September 2014 (aged 94); Edensor, Derbyshire, England
- Residence: Edensor House, Chatsworth Estate
- Noble family: Mitford family
- Spouse: Andrew Cavendish, 11th Duke of Devonshire (m. 1941; died 2004)
- Issue: Lady Emma Tennant, Peregrine Cavendish, 12th Duke of Devonshire, Lady Sophia Topley
- Parents: David Freeman-Mitford, 2nd Baron Redesdale; Sydney Bowles
- Occupation: Writer; memoirist; socialite

Deborah Vivien Cavendish, Duchess of Devonshire (née Freeman-Mitford; 31 March 1920 – 24 September 2014), was an English aristocrat, writer, memoirist, and socialite. She was the youngest and last surviving of the six Mitford sisters, who were prominent members of British society in the 1930s and 1940s. She played a key role in the renovation of Chatsworth House in the second half of the 20th Century.

== Early life ==
Known to her family as "Debo", Deborah Vivien Freeman-Mitford was born in Kensington, London, on 31 March 1920. (Note: Some later sources gave Cavendish's place of birth as Asthall Manor in Oxfordshire, but her entry in the Dictionary of National Biography, which cites her birth certificate, says she was born at 49 Victoria Road, Kensington, London. This matches a record of the registration of her birth in Kensington.) Her parents were David Freeman-Mitford, 2nd Baron Redesdale (1878–1958), son of Bertram Freeman-Mitford, 1st Baron Redesdale, and his wife, Sydney (1880–1963), daughter of Thomas Gibson Bowles, MP.

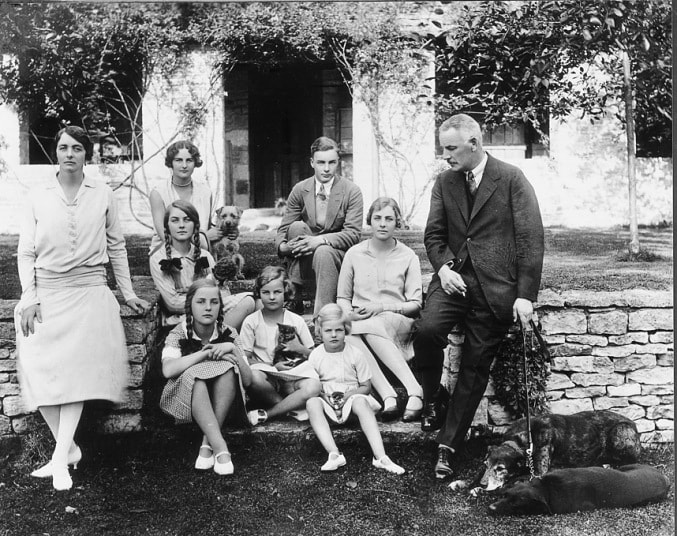
The Mitford family in 1928

Deborah was the youngest of the six Mitford sisters, namely Nancy (born 1904), Pamela (1907), Diana (1910), Unity (1914), Jessica (1917) and Deborah herself (1920). There was one brother, Tom (born 1909), who was killed in action in 1945.

As with her sisters, she did not attend school, but was educated by her mother and a succession of governesses at their home in Swinbrook, Oxfordshire.

Deborah was a contented, loving and cheerful child who, unlike her politically active sisters, was happy to accept life as she found it, and never felt the need to right the world's injustices. In a later memoir, she wrote "as everything in life is unfair, perhaps the sooner it is realised the better".

== Marriage and children ==
In 1941 Deborah married Lord Andrew Cavendish, younger son of the 10th Duke of Devonshire in the Priory Church of St Bartholomew-the-Great, Smithfield, London. When Cavendish's older brother, William, Marquess of Hartington, was killed in action in 1944, Cavendish became heir to the dukedom and began to use the courtesy title Marquess of Hartington. In 1950, on the death of his father, Deborah's husband became the 11th Duke of Devonshire.

She and the duke had seven children, three of whom died shortly after birth, and one who was miscarried:

- Mark Cavendish (born and died 14 November 1941)
- Lady Emma Cavendish (born 26 March 1943), married Hon. Tobias William Tennant, son of the 2nd Lord Glenconner, in 1963 and has three children (including model Stella Tennant).
- Peregrine Andrew Morny Cavendish, 12th Duke of Devonshire (born 27 April 1944)
- An unnamed child (miscarried December 1946; the child was a twin of Victor Cavendish, born in 1947)
- Lord Victor Cavendish (born and died 22 May 1947)
- Lady Mary Cavendish (born and died 5 April 1953)
- Lady Sophia Louise Sydney Cavendish (born 18 March 1957), married, firstly, Anthony William Lindsay Murphy in 1979, divorced 1987. In 1988 she married secondly Alastair Morrison, 3rd Baron Margadale, son of James Morrison, 2nd Baron Margadale, with whom she had two children. Following divorce she married, thirdly, William Topley in 1999.

She was the grandmother of fashion model Stella Tennant (1970–2020) and William Cavendish, Earl of Burlington (born 1969), the heir to the dukedom.

== Chatsworth ==
Deborah Cavendish was the main public face of Chatsworth for many decades. She wrote several books about Chatsworth, and played a key role in the restoration of the house, the enhancement of the garden and the development of commercial activities such as Chatsworth Farm Shop (which is on a quite different scale from most farm shops, as it employs a hundred people); Chatsworth's other retail and catering operations; and assorted offshoots such as Chatsworth Food (later Chatsworth Estate Trading), which sold luxury foodstuffs carrying her signature; and Chatsworth Design, which sells image rights to items and designs from the Chatsworth collections. Recognising the commercial imperatives of running a stately home, she took a very active role and was known to operate the Chatsworth House ticket office herself. She also supervised the development of the Cavendish Hotel at Baslow, near Chatsworth, and the Devonshire Arms Hotel at Bolton Abbey.

In 1999, Cavendish was appointed a Dame Commander of the Royal Victorian Order (DCVO) by Queen Elizabeth II, for her service to the Royal Collection Trust. Upon the death of her husband in 2004, her son Peregrine Cavendish became the 12th Duke of Devonshire. She became the Dowager Duchess of Devonshire at this time, and moved into a smaller house on the Chatsworth estate.

Towards the end of her life, she formed a friendship with Arthur Parkinson, the future gardening author and broadcaster, bonding over their shared interest in hens.

== Selected interviews ==
In August 1982, the Duchess of Devonshire appeared alongside her husband on the BBC Radio programme Desert Island Discs.

She was interviewed on her experience of sitting for a portrait for painter Lucian Freud in the BBC series Imagine in 2004.

In an interview with John Preston of The Daily Telegraph, published in September 2007, she recounted having tea with Adolf Hitler during a visit to Munich in June 1937, when she was visiting Germany with her mother and her sister Unity. Unity was the only one of the three who spoke German and, therefore the one who carried on the entire conversation with Hitler. Shortly before ending the interview, Preston asked her to choose with whom she would have preferred to have tea: American singer Elvis Presley or Hitler. Looking at the interviewer with astonishment, she answered: "Well, Elvis of course! What an extraordinary question."

In 2010, the BBC journalist Kirsty Wark interviewed the Duchess for Newsnight. In it, the Duchess talked about life in the 1930s and 1940s, Hitler, the Chatsworth estate, and the marginalisation of the upper classes. She was also interviewed on 23 December by Charlie Rose for PBS.

On 10 November 2010, she was interviewed as part of "The Artists, Poets, and Writers Lecture Series" sponsored by the Frick Collection, an interview which focused on her memoir and her published correspondence with Patrick Leigh Fermor.

== Death ==
Cavendish died in Edensor, Derbyshire, on 24 September 2014, at the age of 94. Her funeral was held on 2 October 2014 at St Peter's Church, Edensor. Mourners included the then Prince of Wales (later Charles III) and his wife, then-Duchess of Cornwall (later Queen Camilla).

== In media ==
- Chatsworth (2012), BBC One documentary
- Mitford was portrayed by Orla Hill in the UKTV series Outrageous (2025).

== Ancestry ==
Ancestors of Deborah Cavendish, Duchess of Devonshire

Henry Reveley Mitford
Bertram Freeman-Mitford, 1st Baron Redesdale
Georgiana Jemima Ashburnham
David Freeman-Mitford, 2nd Baron Redesdale
David Ogilvy, 10th Earl of Airlie
Lady Clementina Ogilvy
Henrietta Blanche Stanley
Deborah Mitford
Thomas Milner Gibson
Thomas Gibson Bowles
Susannah Bowles
Sydney Bowles
Charles Samuel Evans-Gordon
Jessica Evans-Gordon
Catherine Rose

== Publications ==
The Duchess of Devonshire wrote a number of books in her later years, including several books about Chatsworth and a book of memoirs. She also wrote regular articles for The Spectator and The Daily Telegraph. She was a prolific letter-writer, and two volumes of her exchanges of letters have been published.

=== Books ===
- The House: A Portrait of Chatsworth (1982)
- Chatsworth: The House (revised edition 2002)
- The Estate: A View from Chatsworth (1990)
- The Farmyard at Chatsworth (1991)
- Treasures of Chatsworth: A Private View (1991)
- The Garden at Chatsworth (1999)
- Counting My Chickens and Other Home Thoughts (2002)
- The Chatsworth Cookery Book (2003)
- Round About Chatsworth (2005)
- Memories of Andrew Devonshire (2007)
- Home to Roost ... and Other Peckings (2009)
- Wait for Me! Memoirs of the Youngest Mitford Sister (2010)
- All in One Basket (2011)

=== Letters ===
- The Mitfords: Letters Between Six Sisters (2007, Ed. Charlotte Mosley)
- In Tearing Haste: Letters Between Deborah Devonshire and Patrick Leigh Fermor (2008, Ed. Charlotte Mosley)

== Bibliography ==
- Guinness, Jonathan; Guinness, Catherine (1984). The House of Mitford. London: Hutchinson. ISBN 0-09-155560-4.
- Lovell, Mary S. (2001). The Mitford Girls (paperback ed.). London. ISBN 978-0-349-11505-4.
- The Mitfords: Letters Between Six Sisters (2007), edited by Charlotte Mosley, ISBN 0-06-137364-8
- In Tearing Haste: Letters Between Deborah Devonshire and Patrick Leigh Fermor (2008), edited by Charlotte Mosley
