= Jessica Mitford =

English-American writer and communist (1917–1996)

The Honourable Jessica Treuhaft
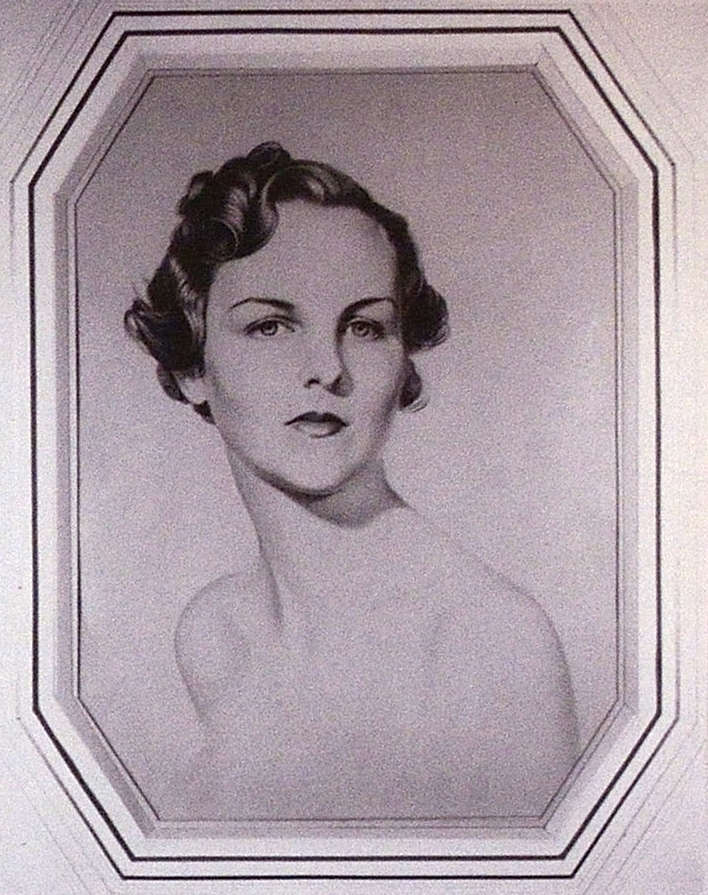
- Mitford by William Acton, 1937
- Born: Jessica Lucy Freeman-Mitford; 11 September 1917; Asthall Manor, Oxfordshire, England
- Died: 23 July 1996 (aged 78); Oakland, California, U.S.
- Occupation: Investigative journalist
- Known for: Mitford sister, communist views
- Notable work: Hons and Rebels; The American Way of Death
- Political party: Communist Party USA (1943–1958)
- Spouses: Esmond Romilly (m. 1937; mia 1941) Robert Treuhaft (m. 1943)
- Children: 4
- Parent(s): David Freeman-Mitford, 2nd Baron Redesdale; Sydney Bowles
- Family: Mitford

Jessica Lucy "Decca" Treuhaft (née Freeman-Mitford, later Romilly; 11 September 1917 – 23 July 1996) was an English-American author, communist activist and one of the Mitford sisters. Her 1960 memoir Hons and Rebels and her 1963 book of social commentary The American Way of Death both became classics.

Jessica married her second cousin Esmond Romilly, emigrating to the United States in 1939. Romilly was reported missing in action in 1941 and, in 1943, Mitford married American civil rights lawyer Robert Treuhaft, with whom she worked closely in the Civil Rights Congress. She took American citizenship in 1944. The couple joined the Communist Party USA and refused to testify in front of the House Un-American Activities Committee.

== Early life and ancestry ==
Born at Asthall Manor, Oxfordshire, the sixth of seven children, Jessica Mitford was the daughter of David Freeman-Mitford, 2nd Baron Redesdale, and his wife Sydney (daughter of politician and publisher Thomas Gibson Bowles). She was one of the Mitford sisters: Nancy (1904–1973), Pamela (1907–1994), Diana (1910–2003), Unity (1914–1948), Jessica, and Deborah (1920–2014). The sisters had one brother, Tom, who in 1945 was killed in action at the age of 36.

Refused permission by her parents to attend school, Jessica was educated at home by governesses, and increasingly rebelled against her heavily circumscribed home life. When she was twelve she opened a 'running away' account at Drummond's Bank, and her social and political conscience was awakened as she read newspaper accounts of the economic depression facing the Britain of the late 1920s.

Jessica's older sister, Unity, with whom as a girl she shared a bedroom, had beliefs at the opposite end of the political spectrum, later becoming a dedicated Nazi and friend of Adolf Hitler. The two sisters drew a chalk line down the middle to divide the room. Jessica's side was decorated with hammer and sickles and pictures of Vladimir Lenin, while Unity's was decorated with swastikas and pictures of Adolf Hitler.

Jessica described her conservative father as "one of nature's fascists", renounced her privileged background while still a teenager, and became an adherent of communism. Mitford said that her parents had "appeased Hitler and Nazism.... He had crushed the trade unions, he had crushed the Communist Party and he had crushed the Jews ... and don't forget there's a huge strain of anti-Semitism that runs through that class in England." She has been called the "red sheep" of the family.

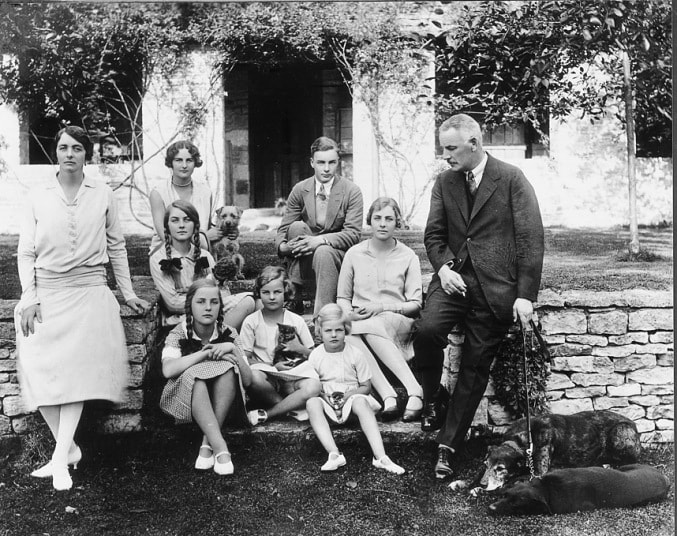
The Mitford family 1928; Front row, L to R, mother (Sydney Bowles), Unity, Jessica and Deborah, father (David Freeman-Mitford, 2nd Baron Redesdale); middle row, Diana and Pamela; back row, Nancy and Tom.

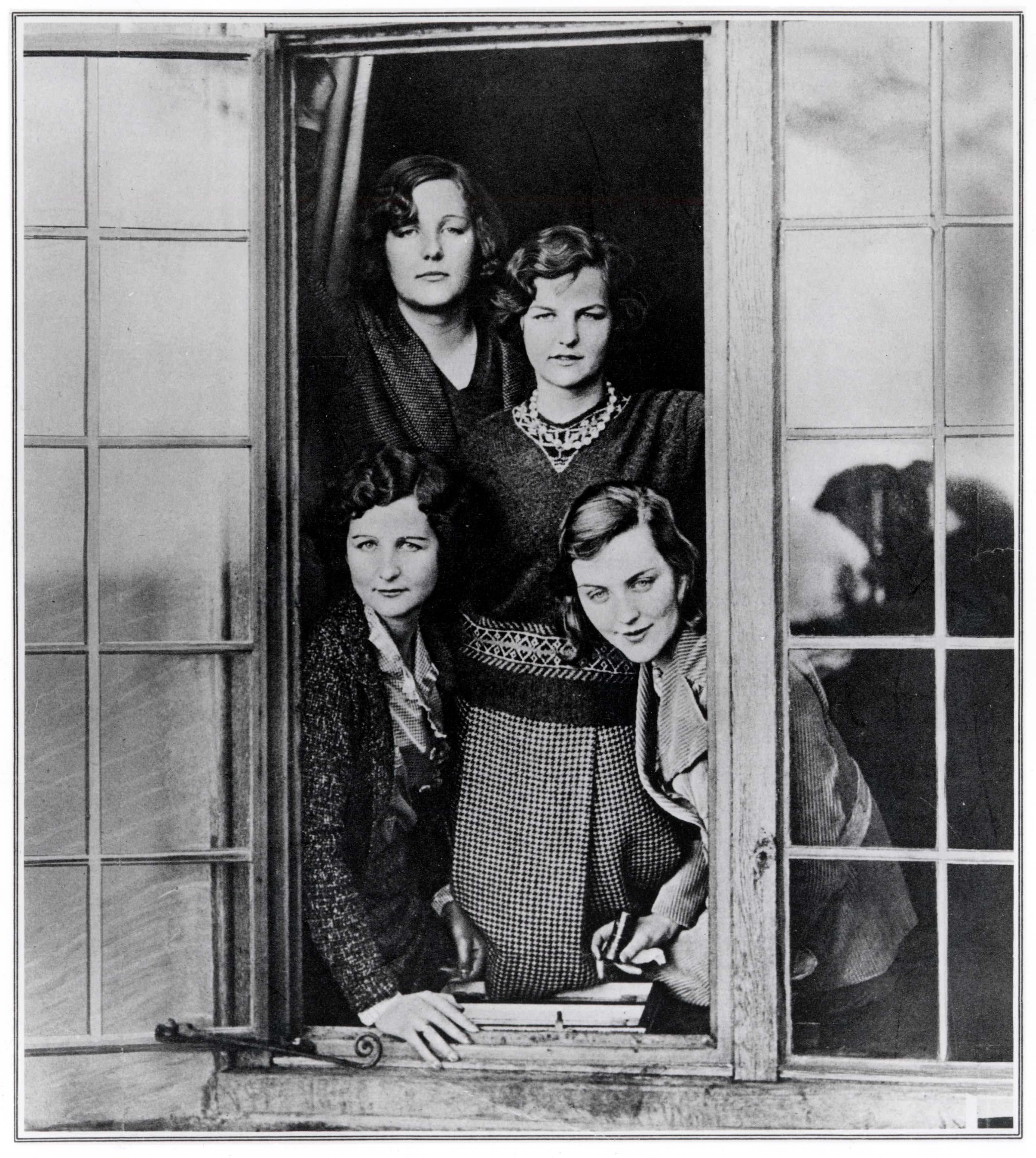
Nancy, Unity, Jessica and Diana Mitford.

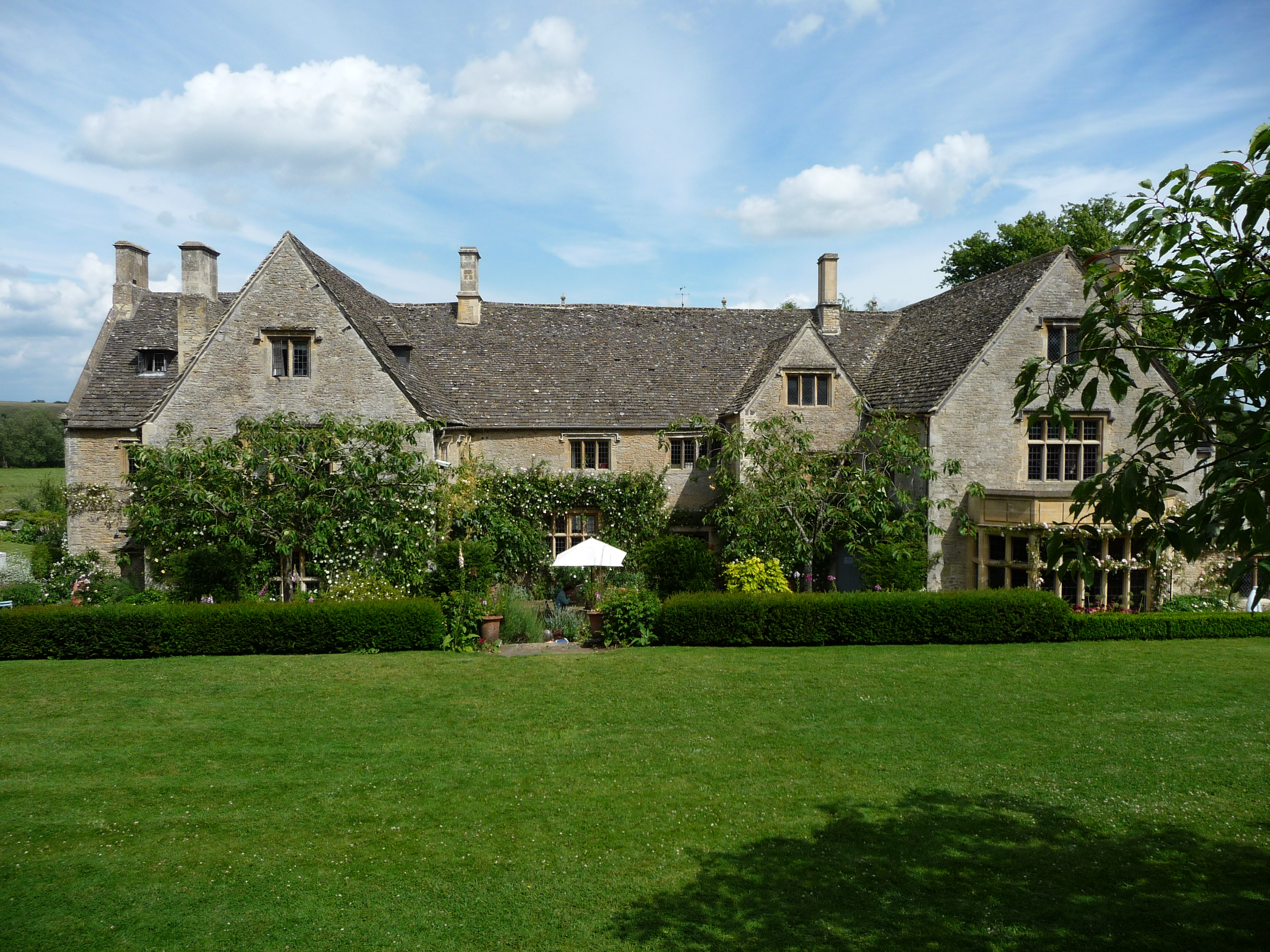
Rear view of Asthall Manor, the Mitford family home

== Marriages and family ==
=== Life with Esmond Romilly ===
At the age of 19, Mitford fell in love with her second cousin, Esmond Romilly, who was recuperating from dysentery caught while defending Madrid with the International Brigades during the Spanish Civil War. Romilly was a nephew of Clementine Churchill, the wife of Winston Churchill. Despite their family relationship, the two second cousins had not previously met, but according to Mitford's own account, "I had been in love with Esmond for years, ever since I first heard of him".

The cousins eloped to Spain, where Romilly picked up work as a reporter for the News Chronicle. The plan was that Mitford would travel as his secretary. As a cover story to explain her departure to her family, Mitford invented an invitation to visit friends in Austria. The pair departed from England on 8 February 1937. They reached Bayonne, on the French-Spanish border, and after a tense wait for Mitford's Spanish visa, they took a cargo boat to Bilbao, Spain. After some legal difficulties caused by their relatives' opposition, they married in a civil ceremony in Bayonne, France, on 18 May 1937.

Romilly and Mitford moved to London and lived in a flat in Rotherhithe in the East End, then mostly a poor industrial area. The ground floor of the building operated as a casino and Romilly worked there as a croupier before landing a more regular job as a copywriter with the advertising firm Graham & Gillies. Mitford gave birth at home to a daughter, Julia Decca Romilly, on 20 December 1937. The baby died in a measles epidemic the following May. Jessica Mitford rarely spoke of Julia in later life, and she is not referred to by name in Mitford's 1960 autobiography, Hons and Rebels.

On 18 February 1939, Romilly and Mitford emigrated to the United States after throwing a farewell party for their friends. They travelled around, working odd jobs. At the outset of World War II, Romilly enlisted in the Royal Canadian Air Force (RCAF); Mitford was living in Washington D.C., and considered joining him once he was posted to England. While living in D.C, with contemporaries Virginia Foster Durr and Clifford Durr, she gave birth to another daughter, Constancia Romilly ("the Donk" or "Dinky") on 9 February 1941. Her husband went missing in action on 30 November 1941, on his way back from a bombing raid over Nazi Germany. Mitford was devastated.

=== Life with Robert Treuhaft ===
Mitford threw herself into war work. Through this, she met and married the American civil rights lawyer Robert Treuhaft in 1943 and eventually settled in Oakland, California. She became an American citizen in 1944.

There, the couple had two sons; Nicholas, born in 1944 (who was killed in 1955 when hit by a bus), and Benjamin, born in 1947. Mitford approached her motherhood in a spirit of "benign neglect", described by her children as "matter-of-fact" and "not touchy-feely". She became closer to her own mother by letter over the decades, but remained estranged from her sister Diana for the rest of her life.

In 1954, Mitford was attacked by a young Black man while going to a meeting at night. Some versions of the story say her husband heard what was happening and rescued her. However, Mitford later told a friend that she was raped by the man who attacked her, and saw a doctor because of what happened. She didn't report the offense to the police because she was afraid it would risk a Black man's life.

== Career and politics ==
=== Communism and left-wing politics ===
Mitford and Treuhaft became active members of the Communist Party in 1943. Mitford spent much of the early 1950s working as executive secretary of the local Civil Rights Congress chapter. Through this and her husband's legal practice, she was involved in a number of civil rights campaigns, notably the failed attempt to stop the execution of Willie McGee, an African American convicted of raping a white woman. In 1953, as Communist Party members at the height of McCarthyism and the 'Red Scare', they were summoned to testify in front of the House Un-American Activities Committee. Both refused to name radical groups and friends or testify about their participation in Communist organisations, and were dismissed as 'unresponsive'.

In 1956, Mitford published a pamphlet, "Lifeitselfmanship or How to Become a Precisely-Because Man". In response to Noblesse Oblige, the book her sister Nancy co-wrote and edited on the class distinctions in British English, popularizing the phrases "U and non-U English" (upper class and non-upper class), Jessica described L and non-L (Left and non-Left) English, mocking the clichés used by her comrades in the all-out class struggle. (The title alludes to Stephen Potter's satirical series of books that included Lifemanship.)

Mitford and Treuhaft resigned from the American Communist Party in 1958, because they had come to the conclusion they could pursue their ideals more effectively outside the party. Mitford felt the party had become "rather useless".

In 1960, Mitford published her first book Hons and Rebels (US title: Daughters and Rebels), a memoir covering her youth in the Mitford household.

=== Investigative journalism ===
In May 1961, Mitford travelled to Montgomery, Alabama, while working on an article about Southern attitudes for Esquire. While there, she and a friend went to meet the arrival of a group of Freedom Riders and became caught up in a riot when a mob, led by the Ku Klux Klan, attacked the civil rights activists. After the riot, Mitford proceeded to a rally led by Martin Luther King Jr. The church at which this was held was also attacked by the Klan, and Mitford and the group spent the night barricaded inside until the siege was ended by the arrival of Alabama National Guard troops.

Through his work with unions and death benefits, Treuhaft became interested in the funeral industry and persuaded Mitford to write an investigative article on the subject. Though the article, "Saint Peter Don't You Call Me", published in Frontier magazine, was not widely disseminated, it caught considerable attention when Mitford appeared on a local television broadcast with two industry representatives. Convinced of public interest, she wrote The American Way of Death, which was published in 1963. In the book, Mitford harshly criticized the industry for using unscrupulous business practices to take advantage of grieving families. The book became a major best-seller and led to Congressional hearings on the funeral industry. The book was one of the inspirations for filmmaker Tony Richardson's 1965 satirical film The Loved One, which was based on Evelyn Waugh's short satirical 1948 novel of the same name, subtitled "An Anglo-American Tragedy".

In 1964 Mitford joined Mark Lane's Citizens Committee of Inquiry.

After The American Way of Death, Mitford continued with her investigative journalism. In 1970, she published an article in the Atlantic Monthly, "Let Us Now Appraise Famous Writers", an exposé of the Famous Writers School, a correspondence course of questionable business practices founded by Bennett Cerf. She published The Trial of Dr. Spock, the Rev. William Sloane Coffin, Jr., Michael Ferber, Mitchell Goodman and Marcus Raskin, an account of the five men's 1970 trial on charges of conspiracy to violate the draft laws, followed by a harsh critique of the American prison system entitled Kind and Usual Punishment: The Prison Business (1973), an allusion to the phrase "cruel and unusual punishment".

Mitford was a distinguished professor for the one semester in 1973 at San Jose State University, where she taught a course called "The American Way" that covered the Watergate scandal and the McCarthy era. The dean insisted that the rule was that she had to swear a loyalty oath and be fingerprinted, although this was not in her contract; she objected, and the campus was thrown into protests and she was forced to go to court to remain able to teach.

In 1976, Mitford taught a seminar on muckraking and investigative journalism at Calhoun College (renamed Grace Hopper College in 2017) at Yale University.

=== Books and music ===
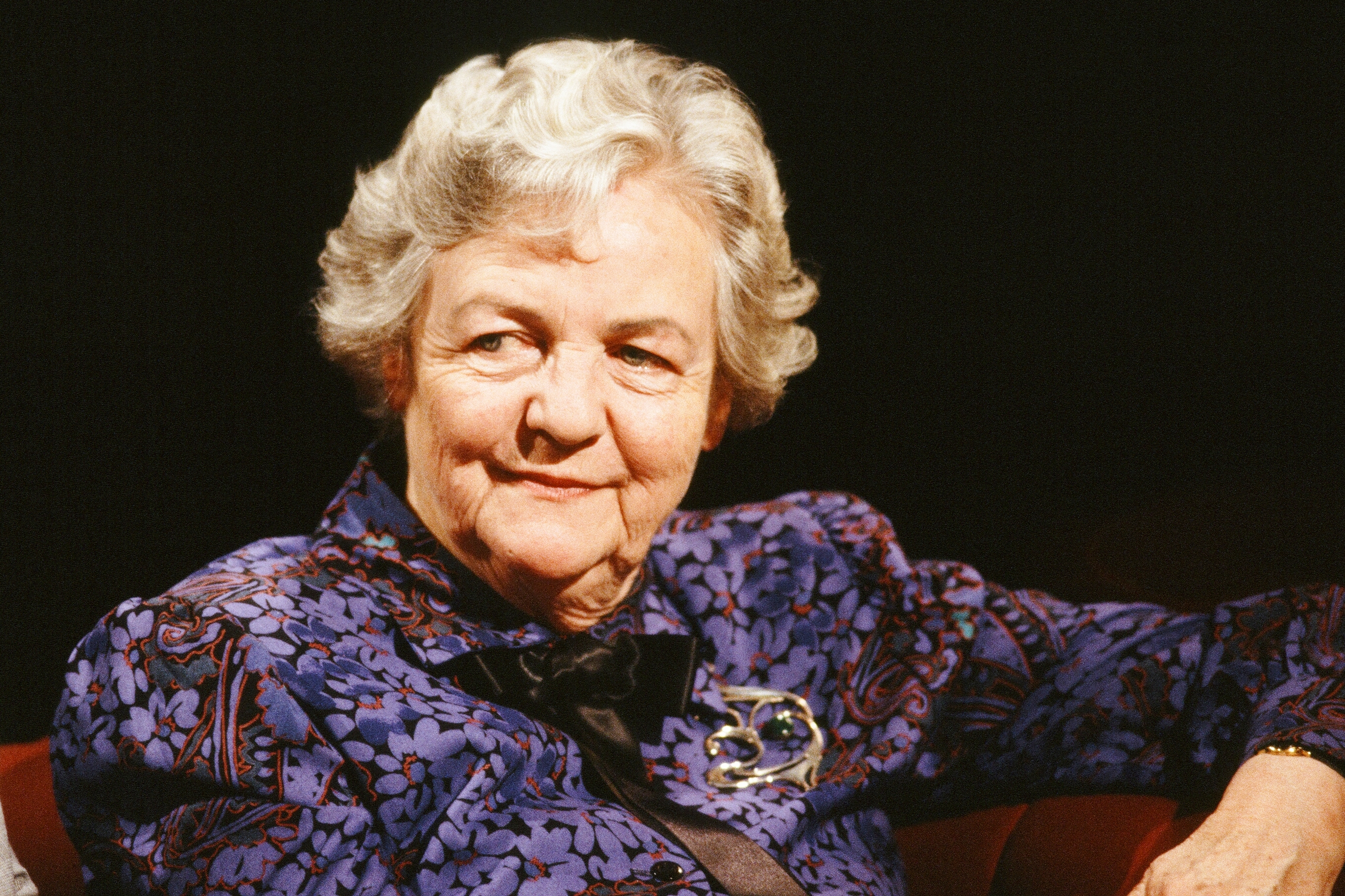
Mitford appearing on British TV show After Dark in 1988

Mitford's second memoir, A Fine Old Conflict (1977), comically describes her experiences joining and eventually leaving the Communist Party USA. Mitford titled the book after what, in her youth, she thought were the lyrics to the Communist anthem, "The Internationale", which actually are "'Tis the final conflict". Mitford recounts how she was invited to join the Communist Party by her co-worker Dobby, to whom she responded, "We thought you'd never ask!" She bristled against the conservative structure in the CP, at one point upsetting the women's caucus by printing a poster with "Girls! Girls! Girls!" to draw people to an event. She mercilessly teased an elder Communist about what she perceived as his paranoia when he wrote out the name of a town where she could get chickens donated from "loyal party members" for a fund raiser. When he wrote Petaluma on a scrap of paper to avoid being overheard by possible bugs, she asked in jest how the chickens should be prepared, and wrote, "Fried or broiled".

In addition to writing and activism, Mitford tried her hand at music as singer for "Decca and the Dectones", a cowbell and kazoo orchestra. She performed at numerous benefits and opened for Cyndi Lauper on the roof of the Virgin Records store in San Francisco. She recorded two short albums: one contains her rendition of "Maxwell's Silver Hammer" and "Grace Darling", and the other, two duets with friend and poet Maya Angelou. Her last work was an update entitled The American Way of Death Revisited.

== Death ==
Mitford died of lung cancer in 1996, aged 78. She died in Oakland, California, where she also spent most of her life. In keeping with her wishes, she had an inexpensive funeral, costing $533.31 – she was cremated without a ceremony, her ashes scattered at sea.

At the time of her death, the San Francisco Chronicle columnist Herb Caen wrote, "In this strangely flat era of 'diversity,' she was the rarest of birds, an exotic creature who rose each morning to become the sun around whom thousands of lives revolved."

And, in one final puckish gesture, Mitford directed her assistant to send a posthumous letter to the largest U.S. funeral corporation asking for reimbursement for all the attention she'd brought them.

Her widower, Robert Treuhaft, survived her by five years.

== Descendants ==
Two of Mitford's children pre-deceased her.

Her surviving daughter, Constancia Romilly, continued the activist tradition, working for the Student Nonviolent Coordinating Committee, which campaigned for African American civil rights; she eventually became an emergency room nurse. Romilly had two children with Committee director James Forman: James Forman Jr., a Yale professor and Pulitzer Prize-winning author, and Chaka Forman, an actor.

Her younger son, Ben Treuhaft, is a piano tuner based in Coventry, West Midlands, UK.

== Legacy and influence ==
John Pilger, who had interviewed Mitford in 1983 for his series Outsiders, said she "combined a finely honed social conscience and a wonderful gallows humour. She inverted stereotypes. I liked her enormously".

The author Christopher Hitchens expressed his admiration for Jessica Mitford and praised Hons and Rebels.

J. K. Rowling, author of the Harry Potter series, stated in 2002:

My most influential writer, without a doubt, is Jessica Mitford. When my grand-aunt gave me Hons and Rebels when I was 14, she instantly became my heroine. She ran away from home to fight in the Spanish Civil War, taking with her a camera that she had charged to her father's account. I wished I'd had the nerve to do something like that. I love the way she never outgrew some of her adolescent traits, remaining true to her politics — she was a self-taught socialist — throughout her life. I think I've read everything she wrote. I even called my daughter Jessica Rowling Arantes after her.

Rowling reviewed Mitford's book of letters, Decca, in The Sunday Telegraph in 2006.

In 2010, Leslie Brody's biography of Mitford, Irrepressible, The Life and Times of Jessica Mitford was published by Counterpoint Press.

In 2013, the singer David Bowie named The American Way of Death as one of his favorite books.

External videos
- Q&A interview with Carla Kaplan on Troublemaker, April 12, 2026, C-SPAN

Carla Kaplan's 2025 biography, Troublemaker: The Fierce, Unruly Life of Jessica Mitford, was regarded as the first scholarly treatment of Mitford's life, with a focus on her political commitments.

== Works ==
- Hons and Rebels (U.S.: Daughters and Rebels), Victor Gollancz, 1960. LCCN 61-4397
- The American Way of Death, Simon and Schuster, 1963. LCCN 63-12575
- The Trial of Dr. Spock, the Rev. William Sloane Coffin, Jr., Michael Ferber, Mitchell Goodman, and Marcus Raskin, Macdonald and Co., 1969. LCCN 74-499009
- Kind and Usual Punishment: The Prison Business, Alfred A. Knopf, 1973. ISBN 0-394-47602-6
- A Fine Old Conflict, London: Michael Joseph, 1977. ISBN 0-718-11617-8
- The Making of a Muckraker, London: Michael Joseph, 1979. ISBN 0-718-11830-8
- Poison Penmanship: The Gentle Art of Muckraking, Alfred A. Knopf, 1979. ISBN 0-394-50260-4
- Grace Had an English Heart: The Story of Grace Darling, Heroine and Victorian Superstar, E. P. Dutton & Co., 1988. ISBN 0-525-24672-X
- The American Way of Birth, E. P. Dutton & Co., 1992. ISBN 0-525-93523-1
- The American Way of Death Revisited, Alfred A. Knopf, 1998. ISBN 0-679-45037-8
- Decca: The Letters of Jessica Mitford, edited by journalist Peter Y. Sussman. Alfred A. Knopf, 2006. ISBN 0-375-41032-5

== Dramatizations and portrayals ==
- Extracts from Decca: The Letters of Jessica Mitford were dramatized for Book of the Week, BBC Radio 4, five 15-minute programs broadcast in November 2006. The readers were Rosamund Pike and Tom Chadbon; the producer was Chris Wallis.
- Mitford is portrayed by Sienna Guillory in the 2020 film Son of the South.
- She is portrayed by Zoe Brough in 2025 British historical drama series Outrageous.

== See also ==
- The Mitfords: Letters Between Six Sisters
- Asthall Manor
- List of people from Oakland, California
