= Pamela Mitford =

British socialite (1907–1994)

The Honourable Pamela Mitford
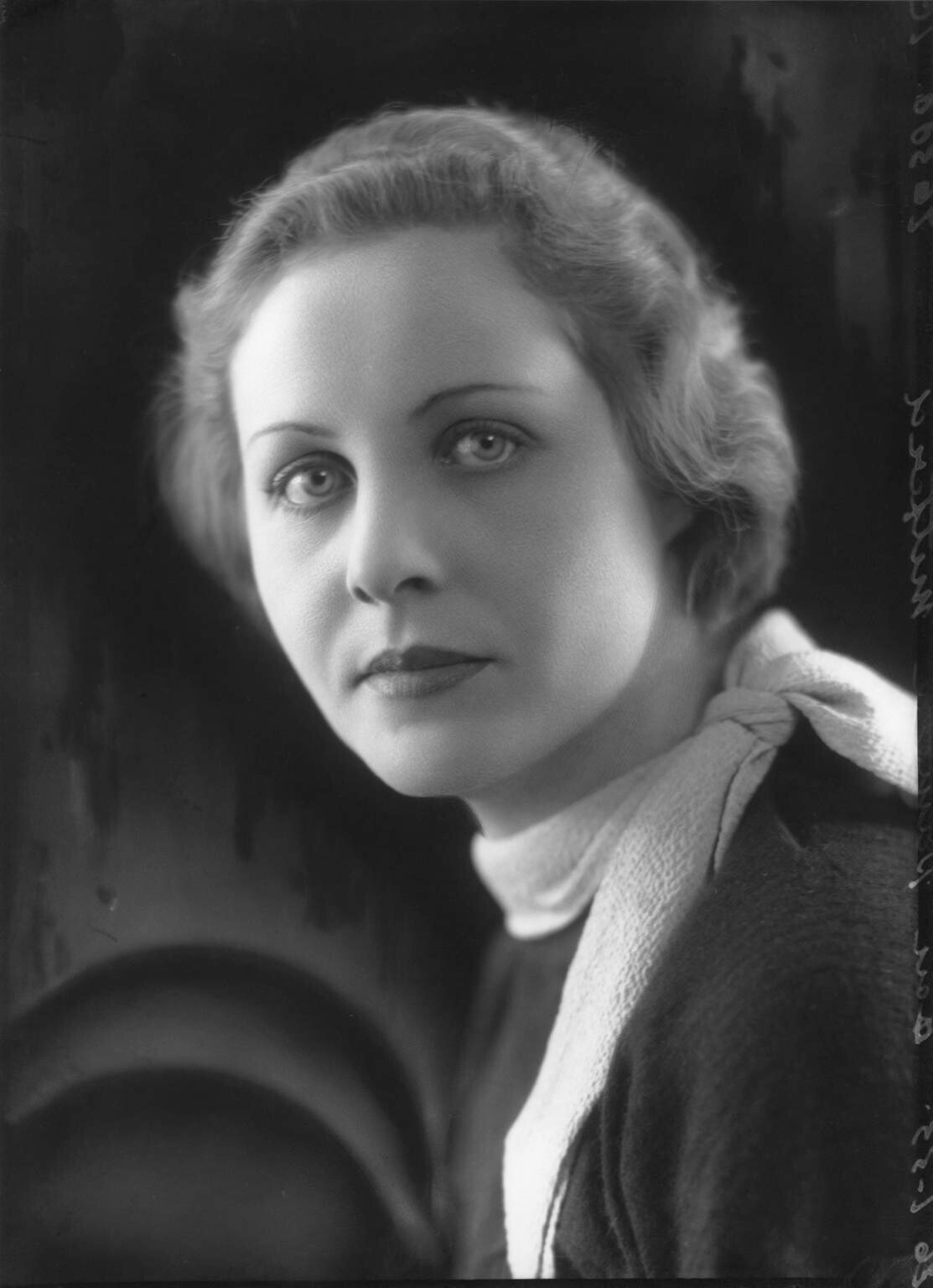
- Jackson in 1933

Personal details
- Born: Pamela Freeman-Mitford; 25 November 1907
- Died: 12 April 1994 (aged 86) London, England
- Spouse: Derek Jackson (m. 1936; div. 1951)
- Parent(s): David Freeman-Mitford, 2nd Baron Redesdale; Sydney Bowles
- Relatives: Mitford family

Pamela Freeman-Mitford (25 November 1907 – 12 April 1994) was a British socialite and one of the Mitford sisters.

== Early life and suitors ==
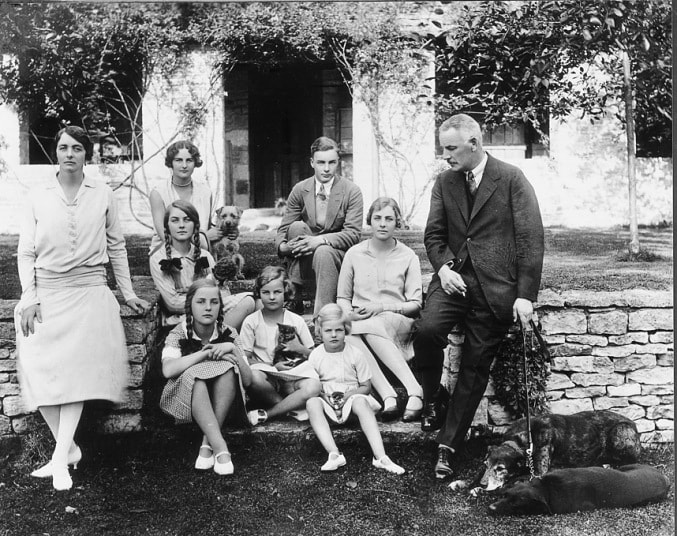
The Mitford family in 1928

Pamela Freeman-Mitford was born on 25 November 1907, the second of six daughters of David Freeman-Mitford, 2nd Baron Redesdale and his wife Sydney Bowles (1880–1963): Nancy (born 1904), Pamela herself (1907), Diana (1910), Unity (1914), Jessica (1917) and Deborah (1920). The Mitford sisters had one brother, Tom (born 1909), who was killed in action in 1945.

In 1928 Mitford became engaged to Oliver Watney, of the Watney's brewery family, whom she had known as a neighbour since childhood; but in May 1929 the Daily Mirror reported that the wedding had been postponed indefinitely due to Watney's pleurisy.

Between 1930 and 1934 Mitford lived in a cottage on the estate at Biddesden in Wiltshire, home of her sister Diana and her husband Bryan Guinness, and managed the dairy farm on their behalf.

Mitford had no shortage of suitors. John Betjeman, who proposed to her twice, referred to her in his unpublished poem, "The Mitford Girls", as the "most rural of them all". She was fond of motoring, and drove her open-topped car on several trips to the continent.

== Marriage ==
In 1936, Mitford married the millionaire physicist and amateur jockey Derek Jackson, whose first marriage had recently ended in divorce. Jackson was bisexual and ultimately married six times. On the couple's honeymoon in Vienna they received news that Jackson's identical twin had been killed in a sleigh-riding accident. Mitford and Jackson settled initially at Rignell House near Swinbrook, Oxfordshire, the home of Mitford's family.

They later lived at Tullamaine Castle in Fethard, County Tipperary, Ireland. She gifted the local Church of Ireland rector Canon Hazelton of a portrait painting of herself as a young woman by the French society painter Paul César Helleu, which was auctioned in December 2015.

After her divorce in 1951, Mitford spent much of the next twenty years as the companion of Giuditta Tommasi (died 1993), an Italian horsewoman. Her sister Jessica described her as having become a "you-know-what-bian", although Diana was less certain. They parted in 1972 when Mitford returned to the Cotswolds to live at Caudle Green.

She died on 12 April 1994, in London, aged 86.

== In media ==
Mitford was portrayed by Isobel Jesper Jones in the UKTV series Outrageous (2025).
