= Esmond Romilly =

British anti-fascist activist (1918–1941)

Personal details
- Born: 10 June 1918 London, United Kingdom
- Died: 30 November 1941 (aged 23) North Sea
- Spouse: Jessica Mitford (m. 1937)
- Children: 2
- Relatives: Giles Samuel Bertram Romilly (brother); Henry Montague Hozier (maternal grandfather); Winston Churchill (uncle by marriage)
- Occupation: Journalist, political activist, soldier

Military service
- Allegiance: United Kingdom; Canada; Second Spanish Republic
- Branch/service: Royal Air Force; Royal Canadian Air Force; Spanish Republican Army
- Years of service: 1941–1941 (Royal Air Force); 1940–1941 (Royal Canadian Airforce); 1936–1937 (Spanish Republican Army)
- Rank: Pilot Officer (United Kingdom); Air Observer (Canada)
- Unit: No. 58 Squadron RAF (United Kingdom/Canada): 35th Division (Spain); XV International Brigade; 14th Division (Spain}; XII International Brigade
- Battles/wars: World War Two; Bombing of Hamburg in World War II; Spanish Civil War; Second Battle of the Corunna Road; First Battle of the Corunna Road; Siege of Madrid

Esmond Marcus David Romilly (10 June 1918 – 30 November 1941) was a British socialist, anti-fascist, and journalist, who was in turn a schoolboy rebel, a veteran with the International Brigades during the Spanish Civil War and, following the outbreak of the Second World War, an observer with the Royal Canadian Air Force. He is perhaps best remembered for his teenage elopement with his second cousin Jessica Mitford, the second youngest of the Mitford sisters.

Born into an aristocratic family – he was a nephew of Clementine Churchill – he emerged in the 1930s as a precocious rebel against his background, openly espousing communist views at the age of fifteen. He ran away from Wellington College, and campaigned vociferously against the British public school system, by publishing a critical left wing magazine, Out of Bounds: Public Schools' Journal Against Fascism, Militarism, and Reaction, and (jointly with his brother) a memoir analysing his school experiences. At the age of eighteen, he joined the International Brigades and fought on the Madrid front during the Spanish Civil War, of which he wrote and published a vivid account.

Before departing for Spain, Romilly had largely abandoned communism (he never formally joined the party) in favour of democratic socialism. Unable to settle in London, he and his wife relocated to America in 1939. When the Second World War broke out Romilly enlisted in the Royal Canadian Air Force and began training as a pilot, but was discharged on medical grounds. He re-enlisted and retrained as an observer. Posted back to England, he lost his life when his plane failed to return from a bombing raid in November 1941.

== Family ==
Esmond Romilly's maternal grandfather was Sir Henry Montague Hozier (1838–1907), a professional soldier and city financier who was knighted in 1903. In 1878 he had married Lady Blanche Ogilvy (1852–1925), eldest daughter of the 10th Earl of Airlie. Four children were produced during the marriage: Katherine, born 1883, Clementine born in 1885, and twins Nellie and William born in 1888. However, the marriage was unhappy and marked by infidelities on both sides, to the extent that the precise parentage of the four children has long been doubted. Hozier appeared to have accepted that the elder daughters were probably his, but largely ignored the twins who, when the marriage ended in 1891, remained with their mother while Hozier initially took responsibility for the older girls before disappearing from the family scene altogether. The question of the twins' paternity remained unresolved. One suggested candidate was the writer Wilfrid Scawen Blunt; another was Blanche's brother-in-law, Lord Redesdale, grandfather of the future Mitford sisters.

Nellie Hozier grew up in the family's various homes in Seaford on the English south coast, in Dieppe in France, and finally in Berkhamsted where she attended the Girls' High School with her elder sister Clementine. In September 1908, she acted as a bridesmaid at Clementine's wedding to Winston Churchill. At the beginning of the First World War in August 1914, Nellie volunteered as a nursing auxiliary in Belgium and was briefly a prisoner of war before repatriation at the end of the year. Back in England, she met an officer in the Scots Guards, Lieutenant-Colonel Bertram Henry Samuel Romilly, who had been seriously wounded while fighting in France. Romilly, the great-grandson of the legal reformer Sir Samuel Romilly, was from a distinguished legal family of Huguenot origin with a long tradition of public service. The couple married in December 1915; their elder son Giles Samuel Bertram Romilly was born on 19 September 1916. The second son, Esmond, followed on 10 June 1918. (Note: Esmond Romilly bore a physical resemblance to his uncle-by-marriage, Winston Churchill, a fact which gave rise to family rumours that Churchill, rather than Romilly, was Esmond's natural father, but there are no substantial grounds to support this.)

== Early life ==
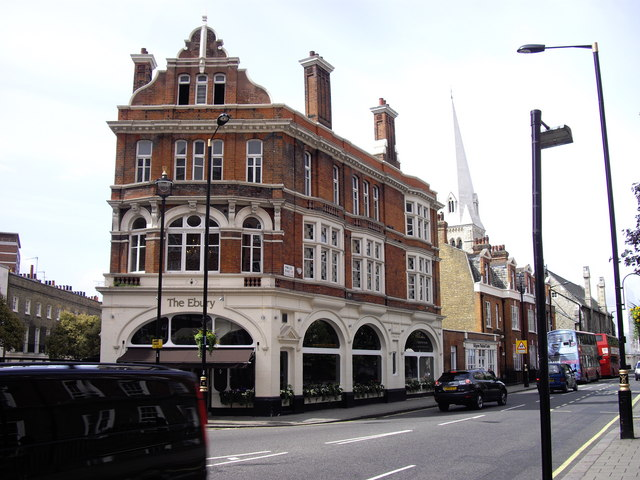
Pimlico Road. No. 15 can be seen in the background, just past the public house

Esmond was born at No. 15 Pimlico Road, in a busy part of London close to Victoria Station. It was a comfortable upper-middle class lifestyle in which Nellie, rather than Colonel Romilly was the principal influence. (Note: Under the pseudonym "Anna Gerstein", Nellie published an autobiographical novel depicting family life in Pimlico Road.) Esmond followed his elder brother to school, first at Gibbs's Day School in nearby Sloane Street and then, from 1927, as a boarder at Newlands Preparatory School at Seaford. Holidays were divided between the family's property in Dieppe and the Churchill cousins' home at Chartwell, and the Romilly estates at Huntington Park in Herefordshire.

Just before his ninth birthday, Esmond began at Newlands in May 1927. It was a small school, with some forty-odd boys; Giles's later account, in which he disguises the school as "Seacliffe" and alters the names of the main personnel, depicts an easygoing and undemanding establishment run by an elderly and by now largely ineffective headmaster. Matters changed when in 1930 the headmaster and others of the old guard finally retired and were replaced by more vigorous and purposeful successors. By his own account, Esmond's academic prowess placed him at the top of the school, although in terms of behaviour he was one of the very worst. Nevertheless, by the time he left Newlands in 1932 he had managed to register a number of personal successes: Head Boy, Patrol Leader of the Otters, captain of cricket and Rugby football, winner of cups for boxing and tennis, and a prize for History.

== Wellington ==
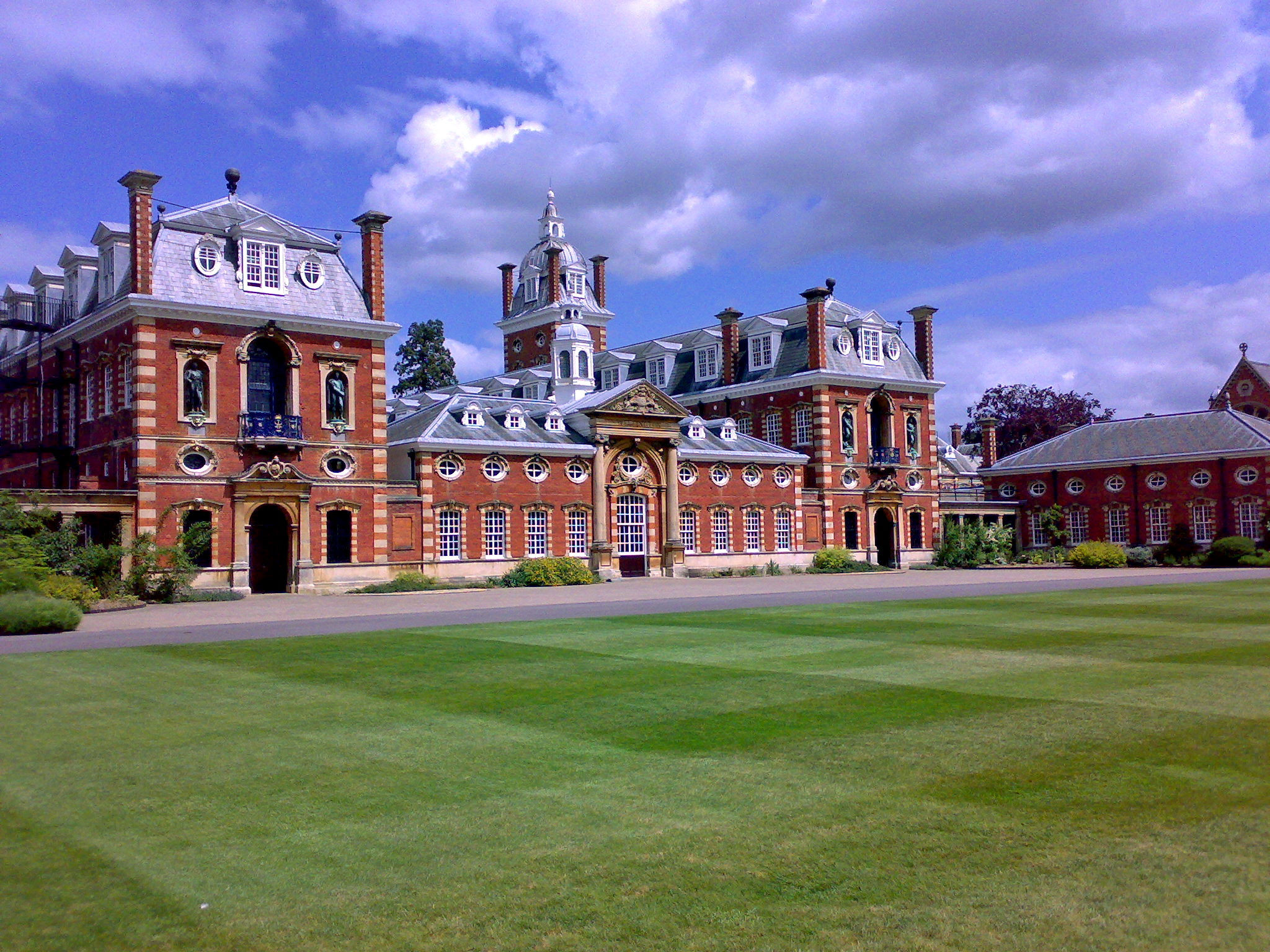
Wellington College

The choice of Wellington as a public school was evidently the boys' own. Giles has revealed that he and Esmond had been entered for Eton College at an early age, and were expected to go there. However, when the time came Giles pleaded to be allowed to go to Wellington instead: "[It] was associated with soldiers and we were both very military". Their wishes were granted; Giles began at Wellington in January 1930, and Esmond followed in September 1931.

=== Reluctant conformist ===
Wellington College had been founded by national subscription as a memorial to the first Duke, who had died in 1852. It had opened in 1859, primarily as a military orphanage for the sons of deceased officers, but by the 1920s had evolved into a public school of a highly reactionary character. T. C. Worsley, who taught there in the early 1930s, described it as "philistine to a degree almost unimaginable in a great school", and "[I]n every possible way ... thirty, forty, fifty years behind the times". Its style was of absolute conformity, based on what Kevin Ingram, Esmond's biographer, calls a "doctrine of suppression"; a tight curriculum that accounted for every moment of the boys' time, and a "dormitory" system that placed boys in small exclusive units that kept them apart from the rest of the school in every activity outside the classroom. Esmond would later write of his "hatred" at seeing "the same faces opposite one every day ... always there was the same monotonous conversation".

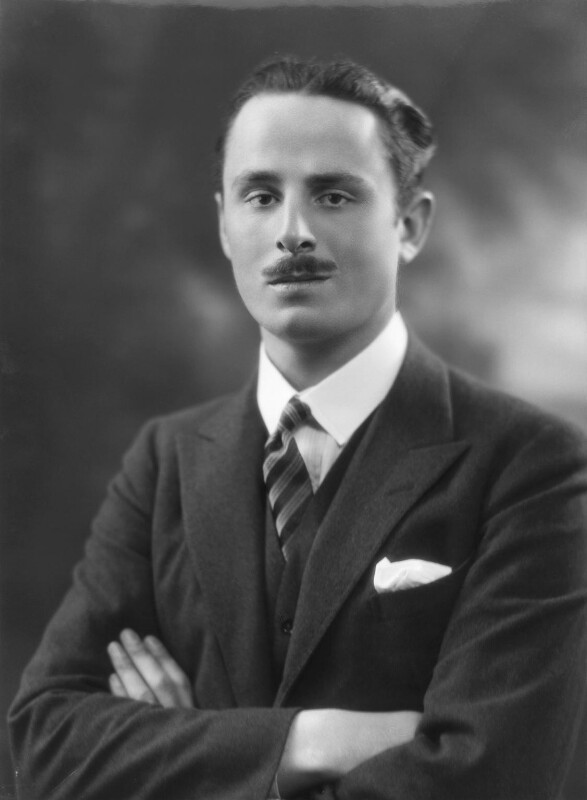
Mosley at about the time of his meeting with Romilly

In her biographical study, Meredith Whitford describes the adolescent Esmond as "conceited, bumptious, argumentative, spoilt, ambitious for authority, a grubby, unhandy child, extroverted and lazy and too intelligent for his surroundings". However, there is little evidence of rebellion on Esmond's part during his first two years at Wellington. In general, he wrote, his politics were of the Daily Express variety. He describes himself since his Newlands days as a romantic Tory, a Jacobite (supporter of the Stuart claim to the British throne), and after meeting Sir Oswald Mosley in October 1931 was briefly attracted to the latter's New Party – he recalls distributing some New Party literature among his fellow-Wellingtonians. Esmond also records a violent quarrel that arose over his decorating his bed with a tartan rug as an ostentatious display of his Jacobitism, but such incidents were rare. In the main he had, according to Whitworth, succumbed to conformity, "abandon[ing] the romantic calls of the past for the strident demands of the present". At the end of his first year, he was awarded a prize – "Middle School Recitation, Third Block" – which he received on Speech Day from the hands of the Duke of Connaught.

=== Rebel ===
When, in the summer of 1932, Giles announced his conversion to Bolshevism, Esmond records his family's shocked reaction (and "Uncle Winston"'s considerable amusement), but at the time, he took no specific steps to embrace communism as a personal creed. That followed some nine months later, during the 1933 Easter holidays spent as usual in Dieppe. Before leaving for France, Esmond had acquired a copy of the Daily Worker, and had arranged for further copies to be delivered to Dieppe. Through this clandestine reading, Esmond made contact with groups of communists in London, and arranged to meet them on his return to England. The meetings duly took place, and Esmond was impressed by them, although his ideas were far from clearly formed: "When I went back to Wellington for the summer term, I took with me an odd collection of ideas". Among other things, like others at the time he tended to confuse communism with pacifism. However, he was determined to convert "at least 20 Wellingtonians" to the new creed.

During the following months Esmond engaged in various acts of somewhat incoherent rebellion. He joined a "peace correspondence" group, until it was clear that his young, female correspondent was more interested in a sexual than a political relationship. His first concrete act against the Wellington establishment came on his 15th birthday, 10 June 1933, when he refused to sign up for the Officers Training Corps, an action which to his disappointment incurred only mild disapproval and which, after consultation with his parents was allowed to stand. He had written a fiery letter to a left-wing student magazine, the Student Vanguard, in which he asserted that "Every boy is compelled to join the Corps at the age of fifteen and must stay there until he leaves", a patently untrue statement for which he was required to provide a written apology.

Towards the end of the 1933 summer term, Esmond took advantage of a school holiday to visit the Parton Street bookshop in West London, where he had arranged to meet one of his communist correspondents. The Parton Street premises, part bookshop, part circulating library, partly a centre for radical intellectuals and poets, was run on a philanthropic basis by David Archer, a Cambridge graduate and former Wellingtonian with whom Esmond struck an immediate rapport. Among the habitués were the poets John Cornford, Stephen Spender and David Gascoyne, the budding actor Alec Guinness, and the soldier-diplomat and writer T. E. Lawrence. The Parton Street Press was Dylan Thomas's first publisher. (Note: Archer eventually introduced Esmond to many of these figures. Dylan Thomas's girlfriend Pamela Hansford Johnson remarked that the 20-year-old poet "looked more like a runaway schoolboy than Esmond Romilly, who really was one".) Whatever the outcome of the arranged meeting, Esmond had, as Ingram remarks, found a new spiritual home in which to revive his flagging spirits. His mood was further improved at the start of the summer vacation when he attended a communist demonstration at Deptford.

Returning to Wellington for the 1933 autumn term, Esmond became the leader of a small group of followers, none of whom he found particularly inspiring. On 15 October, at the Wellington Debating Society, he proposed the motion that "In the opinion of this house the political freedom of women is a sign of a civilized society". Giles led for the opposition, and the motion was defeated by 29 votes to 9. A month later he was involved in perhaps his most direct act of rebellion against the College ethos, when in advance of the Armistice Day commemorations he distributed a consignment of badges from the Anti-War Movement, to be worn in addition to the venerated poppy. From the same organisation he acquired anti-war leaflets which he and a confederate inserted into the hymn-books from which the hymn O Valiant Hearts would be sung at the Armistice service. (Note: Ingram wrongly attributes the hymn to Rudyard Kipling, but it was written by Sir John Arkwright MP and set to music by Dr Charles Harris.) Esmond was again forced to apologise, this time under direct threat of expulsion, and to provide an undertaking that nothing similar would occur in the future.

Although often at odds with each other, the Romilly brothers were capable of working together. In January 1934, after Esmond had addressed a meeting of the Federation of Student Societies (a university-based Marxist organisation that co-ordinated left-wing student activities), the brothers decided to launch a new magazine, Out of Bounds ("Against Reaction in Public Schools"). A manifesto was prepared and circulated among interested parties: the first issue would be in March 1934, it would appear twice termly (cost one shilling); among the problems the first issue would discuss was "the positive and blatant use of the public schools as a weapon in the cause of reaction". Although these initial steps were carried out without undue publicity, by the end of January the story had broken in the right-wing press, giving rise to headlines such as "Red Menace in Public Schools" and "Officer's Son Sponsors Extremist Journal". The headmaster of Wellington, F. B. Malim, who had first given a provisional consent to the project, now demanded that the brothers abandon their activities. Esmond's solution was simple; rather than give up the project he would run away from the school.

=== Out of Bounds ===
The fugitive Romilly found his way to Parton Street and set up his headquarters there, amid considerable press interest and speculation: "Mr Churchill's Nephew Vanishes" was a typical headline. The Sunday Express paid Romilly seven guineas for his story (£7.35, equivalent to nearly £700 in 2026 terms). Archer agreed to pay him a wage of £1 a week to help in the shop; on these sparse resources Romilly set about preparing the first issue of Out of Bounds.

The first issue was published on 25 March 1934. Romilly had been assiduous in developing a distribution network "in every cloister and dormitory he could reach", and had acquired a wide selection of contributions, so that the magazine ran to 35 pages. His own contributions included a fiery editorial, an article on the arms race and a rebuttal of a defence of fascism supplied from Oundle School. There were poems, some literary criticism, a letters page, an article on conditions in girls' schools, and some humorous send-ups of public school life. Despite the relatively moderate overall tone, the Daily Mail denounced the magazine as a "Reds' New Attack" and quoted from the editorial: "We shall infuriate every schoolmaster over 30 (and some under) throughout England".

On 14 April the organisation of Out of Bounds was formalised when a meeting of some 16 delegates from a range of schools appointed a permanent editorial board under Romilly's chairmanship. Next day this board marched to Hyde Park, as part of a demonstration against the National Government's budget policy, under a banner denouncing the "National Government of Hunger, Fascism and War". This was duly reported in the press, ever eager to record the doings of Mr Churchill's nephew. On 7 June, in the company of his new acolyte Philip Toynbee from Rugby School, (Note: Philip Toynbee had run away from Rugby School and found his way to Parton Street, where he met Romilly and was instantly smitten: "In 1934 Esmond was a terrifying figure. He was dirty and ill-dressed, immensely strong for his age and size, his flat face gave the impression of being deeply scarred, and his eyes flared and smouldered as he talked".) Romilly attended a large Blackshirts rally at London's Olympia, from which they were roughly ejected, Toynbee sustaining mild injuries. By this time, Romilly was becoming disenchanted with the Parton Street ambience, and was seeking a rapprochement with his family from whom he had been estranged since his flight from Wellington. In this mood he agreed to return to school, not to Wellington but to the progressive, coeducational school Bedales. He continued his work with Out of Bounds, the second edition of which appeared on 2 July. (Note: Romilly recorded that the second Out of Bounds came in for more criticism and abuse than the first, mainly because of a couple of "outspoken" contributions on the subject of sex in schools, which accumulated much more wrath than the political content of the magazine.) Romilly began at Bedales on 9 June and spent the remainder of the summer term there. In his letters home he professed to like the school, but the feeling was not reciprocated towards him. "This is a boy who can contribute nothing to this school and to whom this school can contribute nothing", was the headmaster's bleak assessment when Romilly departed from the school at the end of July.

Romilly spent the summer and autumn months quietly, in London, subsisting on a small allowance from his father. He had largely lost interest in the magazine, although he continued to contribute; the third issue appeared in November without creating a stir, much of it consisting of what Ingram calls tame repetition. He began a new project, with his brother Giles, in the form of a book in which the pair recounted and analysed their experiences of school. Much of the 1934–35 winter was spent by Romilly in writing his part of the combined work, which Hamish Hamilton agreed to publish. This period of responsible endeavour was interrupted in late December 1934 by a drunken incident which resulted in Romilly's arrest and detention in a remand home for several weeks, from which he was eventually released on a year's probation.

The book Out of Bounds: The Education of Giles Romilly and Esmond Romilly was published in June 1935, to a generally favourable reception, and sold well enough to run to a second edition. Raymond Mortimer in the New Statesman found the book "candid and surprisingly fair"; even the Daily Mail conceded that the young authors had literary ability. The Observer's books critic remarked that the book might tell the true story, rather than the exaggerated accounts evident from the magazine – which the brothers opportunistically brought out in a fourth and final edition to coincide with the book's publication. The centrepiece of this last issue was a frank article on masturbation, supposedly contributed by a doctor.

== Interlude ==
Romilly used his share of the publisher's advance to open a public schools news agency, "Educational News and Features", but the venture soon collapsed. He then took a job selling silk stockings. His political convictions had meanwhile softened, and he joined the Labour Party. By December 1935 he was selling advertising space on commission, and in March 1936 he took a full-time job as advertising manager of World Film News.

== Spain ==
The Spanish Civil War began in July 1936. By October, Romilly was ready to join the fight. He gave his employers a week's notice and, on 19 October 1936, took the boat train to Dieppe. Here he acquired a bicycle and set out for Marseille. The journey through France took him ten days during which he managed to lose both his passport and his money. He arrived in Marseille penniless but found a charity willing to support him while he looked for a ship to take him to Spain. After five days, he obtained a passage to Valencia on SS Mar Caspio.

From Valencia, Romilly and other volunteers were entrained to Albacete, the gathering point where the International Brigades were being organised. For his first few days at the base, Romilly was aligned with a group of Russian emigrés, but within a few days, further shipments from the Maro Caspio had brought a number of English volunteers to the camp. Romilly became part of the group under the leadership of Lorrimer Birch, a Cambridge-educated scientist who, in Romilly's later assessment showed true qualities of leadership and organisation: "a communist first of all, but determined that his communism shouldn't interfere with his fairness of judgement".

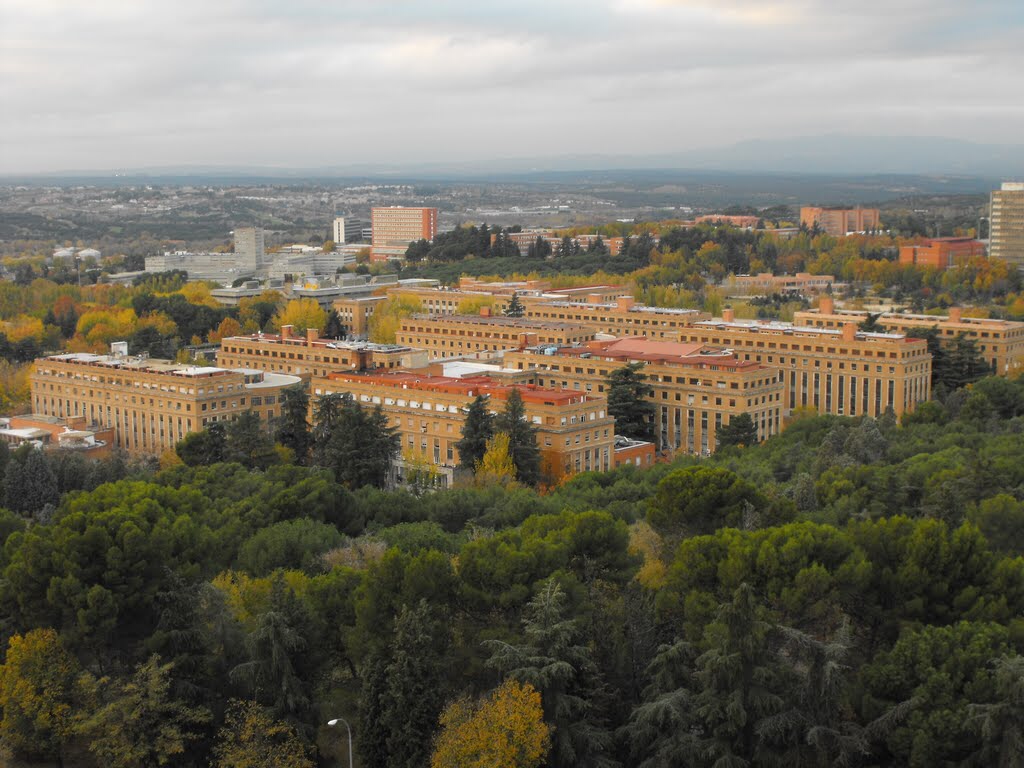
The Faculty of Medicine at the University of Madrid

On 6 November, news reached Albacete that the rebel Nationalist forces had begun their assault on Madrid. Some accounts implied that the capital was on the verge of falling to the rebels. The English group were attached to the Thaelmann Battalion of the XII Brigade, which on 10 November moved to Chinchón, about 50 kilometres south-east of the capital. Two days later Romilly's unit was sent to defend the Madrid-Valencia highway near Vaciamadrid, close to the outskirts of the city. During the next few days Romilly had his first experience under fire in an abortive attack on a supposed rebel-held fortress at Cerro de los Angeles. The action was inconclusive, and on 15 November, the unit returned to Chinchón.

After a brief rest, the XII Brigade was ordered to the University City of Madrid, the city's university campus, which had fallen into rebel hands. For most of the next few weeks, Romilly and the English group were involved in heavy fighting on the edges of the campus, much of it concentrated around a farm complex known as the White House. The buildings passed several times between Republican and Nationalist forces. During a brief rest period in Chinchón, the group was visited by English journalists, who reported Romilly's presence, his family's first news of his whereabouts since his departure in October.

In mid-December, Romilly's unit was sent to Boadilla del Monte, where a strong rebel offensive was under way. In the ensuing battle, nearly all of Romilly's British companions, including Birch, were killed. Romilly survived the fighting, but contracted dysentery and was invalided back to England early in January 1937.

== Elopement ==
At the end of January 1937, while he was recuperating from his Spanish experiences at the home of his distant cousin Dorothy Allhusen (widow of the Conservative MP Augustus Henry Eden Allhusen), Romilly met his second cousin Jessica Mitford. According to Mary Lovell's account, Esmond had learned from his brother Giles that Jessica was interested in going to Spain and suggested to Dorothy that the "pink" Mitford sister would be a suitable house guest. She was the second-youngest of the renowned Mitford sisters, daughters of the 2nd Baron Redesdale. Despite the family relationship, the two had not previously met, but according to Mitford's own account, "I had been in love with Esmond for years, ever since I first heard of him". She was herself a rebel against the restrictions of her upbringing and family life and hoped that Romilly would help her get to Spain. The two found an instant rapport and began immediately to make plans. Romilly had acquired a press card and a contract from the News Chronicle to report on the war and had thus obtained a visa. The plan was that Mitford would travel as his secretary. Mitford had for years accumulated her small savings in what she called her "Running-away account", which now stood at around £50 (equivalent to £2,900 in 2025). That, Romilly announced, would make things much easier.

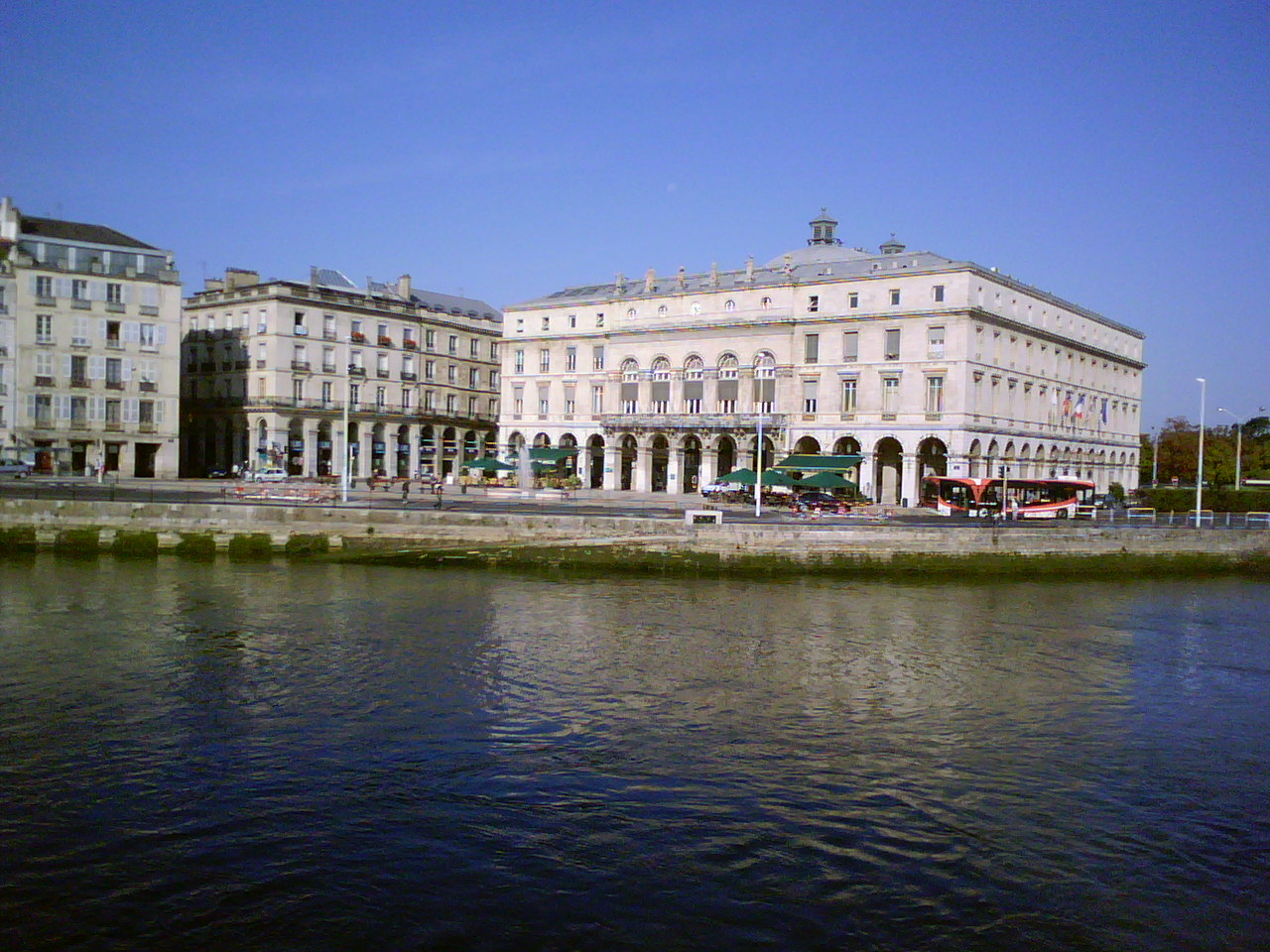
The Civic Hall, Bayonne

As a cover story to explain her departure, Mitford invented an invitation to visit friends in Austria. The pair departed from England on 8 February. They reached Bayonne, on the French-Spanish border, and after a tense wait for Mitford's visa, they took a cargo boat to Bilbao.

By then, their families had discovered the subterfuge and were aware of the fugitive couple's whereabouts and of their intention to marry. The families, bitterly opposed to the union, hoped to avoid press attention, but Romilly opportunistically exploited press interest by selling his story through an intermediary. Headlines appeared in the Daily Express on 1 March 1937 announcing, "Peer's Daughter Elopes to Spain". (Note: The Daily Express mixed the sisters up and named Deborah as the eloping Mitford. Deborah sued for libel and settled out of court for £1,000 damages.) At the same time, the Redesdale family used all their connections to try to bring Jessica home, including the connivance of the British Foreign Secretary Anthony Eden and the use of a naval warship to dispatch the eldest Mitford sister, Nancy, to Bayonne. The couple were initially intransigent, but threatened with the loss of their Spanish visas, they agreed to return to Bayonne, where they were met by Nancy. The elder sister's remonstrances were unavailing, as was a later visit by Lady Redesdale. The couple were married in a civil ceremony in Bayonne on 18 May 1937. The press reported it as "the wedding that even a destroyer could not stop". Meanwhile, there had been a degree of rapprochement with both families and so both Lady Redesdale and Nellie Romilly attended the ceremony.

== London ==
The couple remained in Bayonne since Romilly hoped to return to Spain to report on the war. Thwarted by his failure to obtain a visa, he worked on Boadilla, an account of his experiences fighting with the English brigades. He secured a publisher's advance of £50, which he rapidly lost through an unwise gambling scheme. Mitford was now several months pregnant, and they decided to return to London to a flat in Rotherhithe in the East End that a friend had made available. The ground floor of the building operated as a casino, and Romilly worked there as a croupier before landing a more regular job as a copywriter with the advertising firm Graham & Gillies.

Boadilla was published in the autumn of 1937, but initial sales were poor. In December, a baby daughter named Julia Decca was born but failed to survive a measles epidemic that broke out in the spring of 1938. The baby died on 28 May. The stricken couple abandoned their London life and fled to Corsica, where they spent the summer in a cheap hotel and eked out their savings. In September, they returned to London, to a room in the Marble Arch area, but could not settle into a regular life. The opportunity to escape came in the form of a windfall from a Mitford trust fund, which, on Mitford's twenty-first birthday, provided a sum of £100: enough, they decided, to purchase cheap tickets for America with some money to spare. On 18 February 1939, after throwing a farewell party for their friends, the pair left England for good aboard the SS Aurania, their destination being New York.

=== America, war and disappearance ===
In New York, the Romillys settled in a small Greenwich Village apartment. Mitford found a job in a New York fashion house, and Romilly attempted without success to work as a freelance journalist. Eventually, he found a position in an advertising firm, Topping & Lloyd; the post, a well-paid sinecure, lasted until August 1939 and enabled the couple to acquire a second-hand car and sufficient capital to embark on a tour of America. In Washington, DC, Romilly signed a contract with The Washington Post to provide a series of articles recounting their adventures under the title "Baby Bluebloods in Hobohemia". The winter of 1939–1940 was spent in Miami, where Romilly borrowed $1,000 to acquire the licence to run the Roma bar. The plan was to continue the tour in the spring westward, where Romilly hoped to find work on a ranch before he moved to Hollywood and finally Chicago. However, by May 1940, the war news from Europe (the Second World War had broken out in September 1939) was serious enough for the Romillys to abandon their tour and return to Washington, where Romilly volunteered for service with the Royal Canadian Air Force (RCAF).

Romilly departed for Canada to begin training, first at Toronto and later at Regina, Saskatchewan, while Mitford remained in Washington, pregnant with her second child (a daughter, Constancia, was born on 9 February 1941). Meanwhile, Romilly's training did not run smoothly. In November 1940 he was disqualified from aircrew duties because of a previously-undetected radical mastoidectomy and discharged from the RCAF. However, he obtained an immediate reinstatement to train as an air observer at Malton, Ontario. In the summer of 1941, on the completion of his training, he was posted to England, where he was attached to No. 58 Squadron RAF as a navigator with the rank of pilot officer. On 30 November 1941, while participating in a raid on Hamburg, Romilly's aircraft failed to return and was lost over the North Sea with all on board. Air-sea rescue operations begun out the following morning could find no trace of the craft or any survivors, and on 3 December, the search was abandoned. Mitford was notified by telegram on 1 December. Romilly is commemorated on the Runnymede Memorial.

== See also ==
- List of people who disappeared mysteriously at sea

== Sources ==
- Fraser, Robert (2012). Night Thoughts: The Surreal Life of the Poet David Gascoyne. Oxford: Oxford University Press. ISBN 978-0-19-955814-8.
- Ingram, Kevin (1985). Rebel: The Short Life of Esmond Romilly. London: Weidenfeld and Nicolson. ISBN 0-297-78707-1.
- Lovell, Mary (2002). The Mitford Girls. London: Abacus. ISBN 978-0-349115-05-4.
- Mitford, Jessica (1989). Hons and Rebels. London: Victor Gollancz. ISBN 978-0-575045-33-0.
- Romilly, Giles; Romilly, Esmond (2015). Out of Bounds: The Education of Giles Romilly and Esmond Romilly. London: Umbria Press. ISBN 978-1-910074-06-0.
- Romilly, Esmond (1937). Boadilla. London: Hamish Hamilton; Republished (2018), London: The Clapton Press. ISBN 978-1-9996543-0-6.
- Seldon, Anthony; Walsh, David (2013). Public Schools and The Great War. London: Pen and Sword. p. 216. ISBN 978-1-78159-308-0.
- Toynbee, Philip (1954). Friends Apart: A Memoir of Esmond Romilly and Jasper Ridley in the Thirties. London: Macgibbon & Kee. OCLC 463281712.
- Whitford, Meredith (2014). Churchill's Rebels: Jessica Mitford and Esmond Romilly. London: Umbria Press. ISBN 978-1-910074-01-5.
- Worsley, T.C. (1985). Flannelled Fool: A Slice of Life in the Thirties. London: The Hogarth Press. ISBN 0-7012-0590-3.
