= Tom Mitford =

British Army officer (1909–1945)

Major The Honourable Tom Mitford
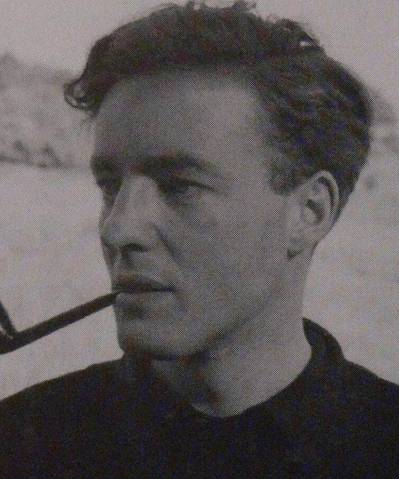

Personal details
- Born: Thomas David Freeman-Mitford; 2 January 1909 England
- Died: 30 March 1945 (aged 36) Sagaing, British Burma
- Cause of death: Killed in action
- Resting place: Taukkyan War Cemetery
- Parent(s): The 2nd Baron Redesdale; Sydney Bowles
- Relatives: Mitford family The Kennels
- Education: Lockers Park School and Eton College

Military service
- Allegiance: United Kingdom
- Branch/service: Devonshire Regiment
- Rank: Major
- Battles/wars: Second World War: Pacific War; Burma Campaign; Burma campaign 1945 †

Major Thomas David Freeman-Mitford (2 January 1909 – 30 March 1945) was a British Army officer best known for being the only son of the 2nd Baron Redesdale and only brother of the Mitford sisters.

During the Second World War, Mitford joined the British Army, and was initially deployed to Italy and North Africa. A Nazi sympathizer, Mitford was sent to fight in the Pacific after saying he did not want to fight against Germany. He was killed in action against Japanese forces in March 1945.

== Early life ==
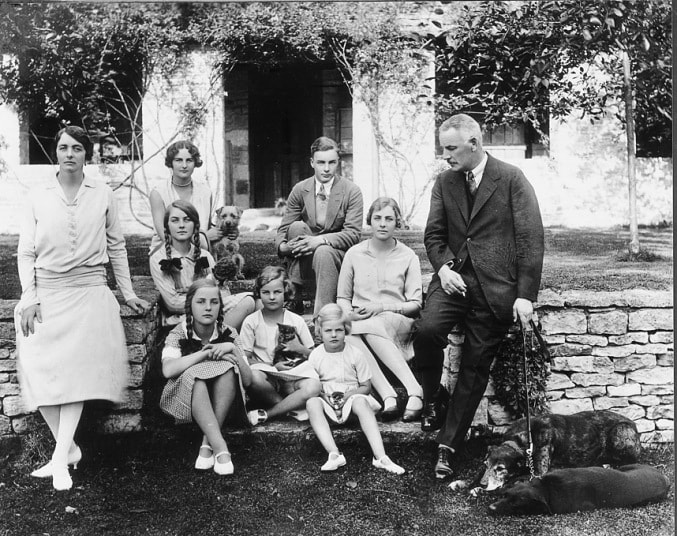
The Mitford family in 1928

Mitford was born on 2 January 1909, the only son of David Freeman-Mitford, 2nd Baron Redesdale. He attended Lockers Park School in Hertfordshire and Eton College. He had relationships with several students there, among whom were Jim Lees-Milne and Hamish St. Clair-Erskine (later engaged to his sister Nancy).

In the late 1920s, Mitford studied law in Berlin, and it was at that time that he first showed an inclination to the Nazi Party.

== Military service and death ==
While serving, at first Mitford chose to serve in Italy and North Africa, and then in Burma, since he did not want to fight against Germany.

Mitford was killed on 30 March 1945 in Burma, while serving with the Devonshire Regiment. He is buried at Taukkyan War Cemetery. His sister Diana, Lady Mosley, wrote: "his loss was something from which I never recovered for the rest of my life". His father, Lord Redesdale, erected a memorial tablet inside St Mary's Church, Swinbrook, near their home, Swinbrook House. The 2nd Baron Redesdale, Lady Mosley, Nancy Mitford, and Unity Mitford are buried in the churchyard, while Pamela Mitford is buried in the northwest of the tower. Another tablet to the memory of Tom Mitford is inside Holy Trinity Church, Horsley, just south of Rochester, Northumberland, near their estate in Northumberland.

== Personal life ==
In July 1929, Mitford took part in the "Bruno Hat" art hoax. He took the role of the imaginary reclusive artist, Bruno Hat; other Bright Young Things involved were Brian Howard, Evelyn Waugh, Bryan Guinness, and John Banting.

Mitford had relationships with both Hamish Erskine and James Lees-Milne at Eton.

In the summer of 1930, Mitford met Sheilah Graham, who would later describe him in her memoirs, Beloved Infidel, as "a youthful edition of his father and, at twenty-one, one of the handsomest men I had ever seen".

In the 1930s, he was a lover of Austrian-born dancer Tilly Losch, while she was married to art patron Edward James.

== In media ==
Mitford was portrayed by Toby Regbo in the UKTV series Outrageous (2025).
