= Robert Treuhaft =

American lawyer

- Born: August 8, 1912; New York City, U.S.
- Died: November 11, 2001 (aged 89); New York, U.S.
- Education: Harvard University (1934); Harvard Law School (LL.B., 1937)
- Occupations: Attorney, political activist
- Spouse: Jessica Mitford (m. 1943; died 1996)

Robert Edward Treuhaft (August 8, 1912 – November 11, 2001) was an American lawyer and the second husband of Jessica Mitford.

== Early life ==
Robert Treuhaft was born on August 8, 1912, in New York City. He was the son of Hungarian Jewish immigrants. He graduated from Harvard University in 1934 and attained his LL.B. degree from Harvard Law School in 1937.

== Career ==
Treuhaft worked for labor union and radical left causes much of his life. From the early-to-mid-1940s to 1958 he and Mitford were members of the Communist Party USA, leaving the party when they felt it had become ineffective.

Treuhaft was admitted to the California Bar in 1944, and in 1945, he began at the Oakland, California law firm Grossman, Sawyer, & Edises. In 1963, he founded his own Oakland-based firm Treuhaft, Walker, and Bernstein, where Hillary Clinton worked as a summer intern in 1971. Also in 1963, he provided Mitford with background and legal information that was important for Mitford's best-selling exposé of the funeral industry, which he also unofficially co-authored, The American Way of Death.

In 1964, Treuhaft represented more than 700 Free Speech Movement students arrested during a two-day sit-in at the University of California, Berkeley. He and his firm also represented anti-Vietnam War protesters, the Black Panther Party, the Student Nonviolent Coordinating Committee (SNCC), and the Congress of Racial Equality (CORE).

Before his death, Treuhaft specified that any memorial donations be sent to "Send a Piano to Havana" project, which was started by his son Benjamin Treuhaft, whom the State Department had prevented from taking a piano to the embargoed island.

== Death ==
Treuhaft died on November 11, 2001.
