= Mitford =

Mitford may refer to:

== People ==
- Mitford (surname)

== Places ==
- Mitford, South Carolina
- Mitford, North Carolina, a fictional town that is the setting for The Mitford Years series by Jan Karon
- Mitford, Northumberland, England
  - Mitford Castle
  - Mitford Hall
  - Mitford Old Manor House
- Mitford, one of the hundreds of Norfolk in England
  - Mitford and Launditch Rural District, Norfolk, England

== Hospital ==
- Mitford Hospital, Dhaka, Bangladesh
