= Castle Island =

Castle Island may refer to:

== Bermuda ==
- Castle Island, Bermuda, one of the islands of Castle Harbour, Bermuda
  - Castle Islands Fortifications, Bermuda

== Canada ==
- Castle Island, Alberta
- Castle Island, Manitounuk Islands, Nunavut

== Greenland ==
- Castle Island (Greenland), an island in Sherard Osborn Fjord

== Ireland ==
- Castle Island (County Cork), and uninhabited island in Roaringwater Bay (51.507518N, 9.504267W)
- Castle Island (County Roscommon), an island in Lough Key
- Castleisland, a town in County Kerry, Ireland

== New Zealand ==
- Castle Island, New Zealand

== United Kingdom ==
- Castle Island, County Down, a townland in County Down, Northern Ireland
- Castle Island, County Antrim, a townland in County Antrim, Northern Ireland
- Castle Island, England, an ait of the River Wansbeck, Northumberland
- Castle Island, Scotland

== United States ==
- Castle Island (Massachusetts), a peninsula in Boston Harbor
- Castle Island (New York), formerly an island in the Hudson River currently part of the Port of Albany-Rensselaer in Albany, New York
- Castle Island (Washington), one of the San Juan Islands
