= Stanton, Northumberland =

Hamlet in Northumberland, England

Coordinates: 55.200°N 1.789°W

Stanton
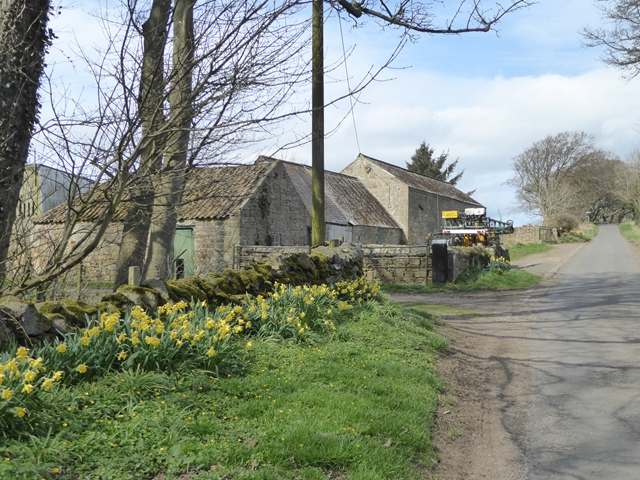

- Location within Northumberland
- OS grid reference: NZ135895
- Civil parish: Netherwitton
- Unitary authority: Northumberland
- Ceremonial county: Northumberland
- Region: North East
- Country: England
- Sovereign state: United Kingdom
- Post town: MORPETH
- Postcode district: NE65
- Dialling code: 01670
- Police: Northumbria
- Fire: Northumberland
- Ambulance: North East
- UK Parliament: Berwick-upon-Tweed

Stanton is a small hamlet and former civil parish, now in the parish of Netherwitton, in Northumberland, England, which is located 7 miles (11 km) north west of Morpeth, and 15 miles (24 km) north of Newcastle upon Tyne. Stanton is 9 miles (14 km) from the Northumberland National Park (NNPA). In 1951 the parish had a population of 70.

The hamlet lies near to the River Font which joins the River Wansbeck near Mitford.

== Governance ==
Stanton is in the parliamentary constituency of Berwick-upon-Tweed. Stanton was formerly a township in Long Horsley parish, from 1866 Stanton was a civil parish in its own right until it was abolished on 1 April 1955 and merged with Netherwitton.
