= William Mitford (disambiguation) =

William Mitford (1744–1827) was an English historian.

William Mitford may also refer to:

- William Mitford (singer-songwriter) (1788–1851), Tyneside songwriter of "The Pitman’s Courtship" and many others
- William Townley Mitford (1817–1889), Victorian Conservative Party politician in Britain
- William Mitford (c.1369–1423), MP for Northumberland
- William Kenyon Mitford (1857–1943), British Army officer, landowner and courtier
