= A Light in the Window =

A Light in the Window may refer to:

- A Light in the Window (novel), a novel by Jan Karon
- A Light in the Window (film), a 1942 Argentine horror thriller film
- A Light in the Window (Loginov's novel), a 2002 novel by Svyatoslav Loginov

== See also ==
- Light in the Window, a 1952 short film
