= Mitford Castle =

Grade I listed castle in the United Kingdom

- Northumberland, England, UK
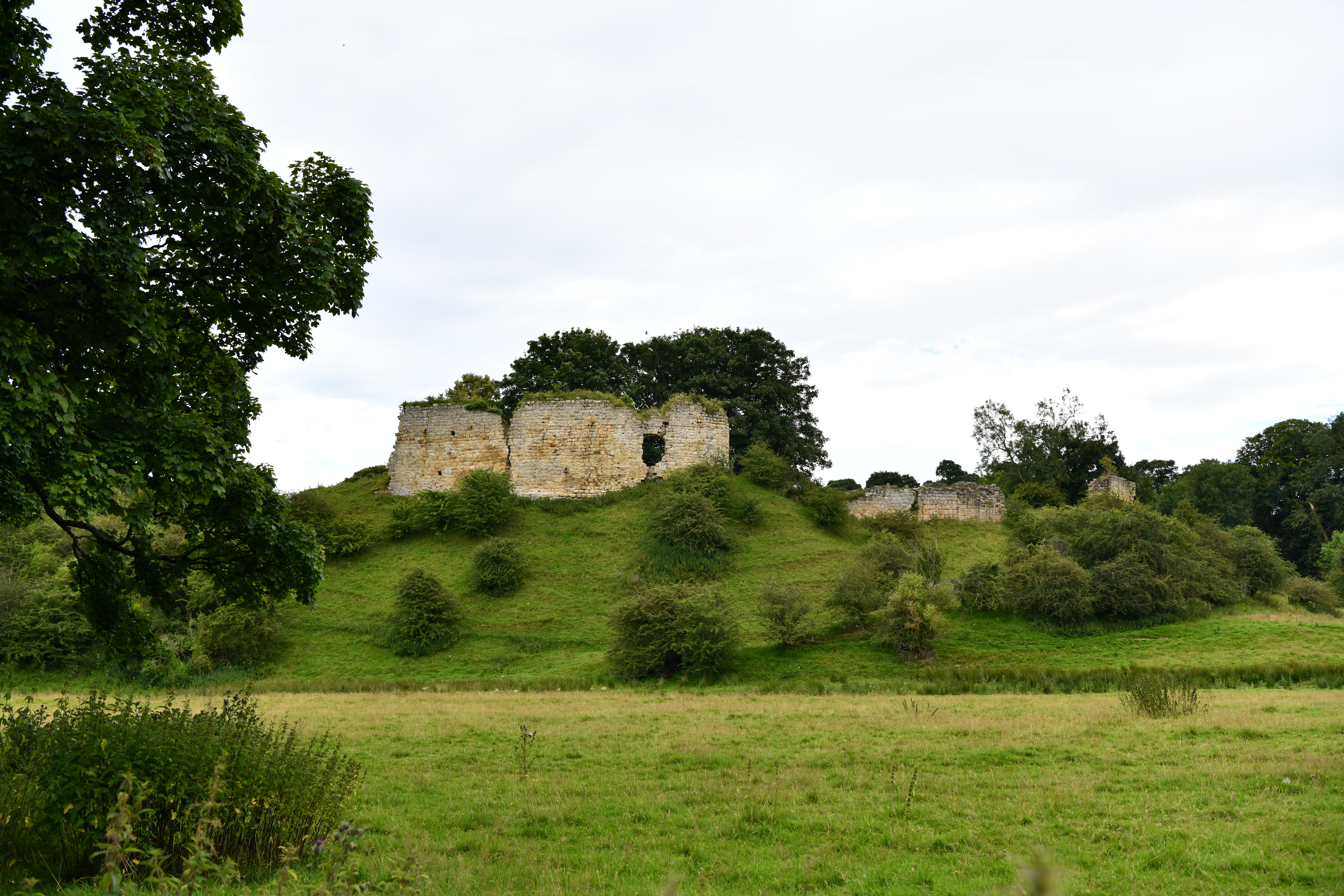
- Mitford Castle in 2024

Location
- Location in Northumberland
- Coordinates: 55.164°N 1.734°W
- Grid reference: NZ170855

Mitford Castle is an English castle dating from the end of the 11th century and located in the village of Mitford, Northumberland, to the west of Morpeth. It is a Scheduled Ancient Monument and a Grade I listed building, enlisted on 20 October 1969. The castle is also officially on the Buildings at Risk Register. The Norman motte and bailey castle stands on a small prominence, a somewhat elliptical mound, above the River Wansbeck. The selected building site allowed for the natural hill to be scarped and ditched, producing the motte.

Mitford Castle was the first of three seats for the main line of the Mitford family constructed on manor lands. Following the destruction of Mitford Castle, Mitford Old Manor House (nearby and to the northwest) was used from the 16th century until the construction of Mitford Hall in 1828. Mitford Hall stands in an 85-acre (340,000 m^{2}) park to the west of the castle ruins.

== History ==
There were few if any stone castles in England prior to the 1066 Norman Conquest. After that date the land was held by Sir John de Mitford, whose only daughter and heiress, Sybilla Mitford, was given in marriage by William the Conqueror to the Norman knight, Richard Bertram. In the late 11th century Mitford Castle was an earthwork fortification of the Bertram family, and on record as William Bertram's oppidum in 1138. In 1215, it was seized by the English King John's troops. In 1264, the stone castle was held by the third Roger Bertram, but in that year, it was seized from him and committed to the custody of William de Valence, 1st Earl of Pembroke, King Henry's half-brother. It was held by Alexander de Balliol, the son of John de Balliol and the elder brother of John Balliol, King of Scotland (nicknamed 'Toom Tabard', meaning 'empty coat'), in 1275. During the rebellion in Northumberland in the 1310s, Mitford Castle was seized from the Valence family by Sir Gilbert de Middleton and Sir John de Lilburn. In 1315, Mitford Castle was used by Sir Gilbert for kidnappings and as a gaol for high-profile prisoners such as Lewis de Beaumont, Bishop of Durham, his brother Harry de Beaumont and two Italian cardinals who had been travelling with him from Darlington to Durham. However, Ralph de Greystoke seized de Middleton for treason, and he was taken to the Tower of London and executed.

There are conflicting accounts over the castle's destruction. One theory is of a fire during Middleton's rebellion. Another theory is that it was destroyed by the Scots in May 1318 during Middleton's imprisonment in the Tower of London. It was certainly ruinous by 1323, as records of an inquest held that year after the death of its then owner Aymer de Valence, Earl of Pembroke, state Mitford Castle to be " entirely destroyed and burnt." At the time of his death in 1335, Mitford Castle had been seized from its then holder, David II Strathbogie, Earl of Atholl, 2nd baron.

The estate, including the castle, was purchased by the Bruce Shepherd family in 1993 from the Mitford family. English Heritage grants in the 2000s were offered towards repairs, restoration and preservation, and some of the work has been completed.

== Architecture ==
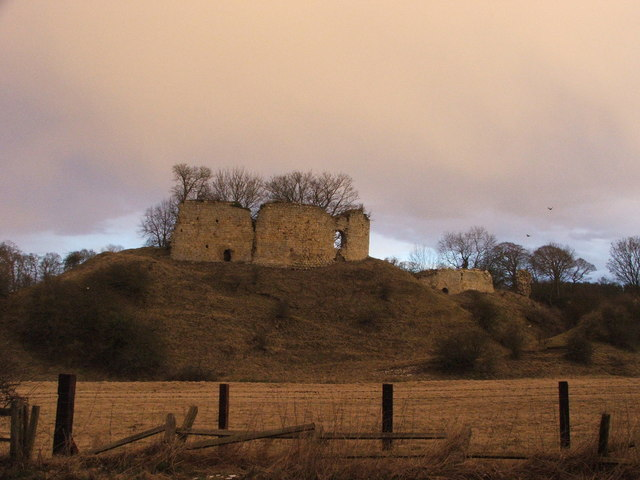
View of Mitford Castle on its somewhat elliptical mound

The castle ruins are of ashlar quality squared-stone construction. The inner ward was built in the early 12th century. The western section of the inner ward is on a stepped plinth and includes a large rounded archway. The eastern section of the inner ward wall has a round arch to the outer ward of 19th-century reconstruction. The inner ward contains an unusual pentagonal keep that stands to the first floor and dates from the early 13th century. The keep was built on the highest point at the northernmost area of the castle, with each of its five sides being of a different dimension, and its internal area measuring approximately 22 sq ft (2.0 m^{2}). The triangular outer ward to the south and east was built in the late 12th century. The divided basement contains two barrel-vaulted chambers that may have been used as water cisterns.

The chapel, built in the mid 12th century and largely destroyed in the early 19th century by quarrying, is also of squared stone. A sanctuary or chancel arch remain. A cemetery was uncovered in 1939 north of the chapel with headstones dating to the 12th century. At least one stone was moved to Mitford churchyard nearby, with others removed or vandalised.

Remains of a 12–13th century east curtain wall of squared stone include a gateway to a barmkin (a defensive enclosure), mural chambers, a garderobe (a toilet), and a round arch. This east curtain wall area is flanked by a semicircular breastwork, the strongest part of the building. The west curtain wall and structures are also of the 12–13th century and squared stone, with different builds and masonry types found across three different sections. An inner courtyard used as a garden and orchard measured approximately 340 ft (100 m) by 340 ft (100 m).

=== Historic listing designations ===
Five remaining elements of the castle are listed structures, all at the highest grade, Grade I. These are the remains of the castle's inner ward, and its keep, the remnants of the East and West curtain walls, the ruins of the castle chapel, and two headstones in the chapel's graveyard.
