= Mitford (surname) =

Mitford is a surname, and may refer to:

- Bertram Freeman-Mitford, 1st Baron Redesdale (1837–1916), British diplomat, collector and writer, paternal grandfather of the Mitford sisters
- Bertram Mitford (novelist) (1855–1914), British colonial writer and cultural critic
- Bertram Mitford (British Army officer) (1863–1936)
- Charles Mitford (1785–1831), English cricketer
- David Freeman-Mitford, 2nd Baron Redesdale (1878–1958), British peer, soldier, and landowner, father of the Mitford sisters.
- Deborah Mitford, married name Deborah Cavendish, Duchess of Devonshire (1920–2014), English aristocrat and writer
- Diana Mitford, married name Diana Mosley (1910–2003), wife of Oswald Mosley
- Edward Cecil Mitford (1908–2002), British Army officer
- Eustace Reveley Mitford (1810–1869), settler and satirist "Pasquin" in South Australia
- Ivan Mitford-Barberton (1896–1976), South African sculptor, writer and authority on heraldry
- Jessica Mitford (1917–1996), Anglo-American author, journalist and political campaigner
- John Mitford (Royal Navy officer) (1782–1831), British naval officer and writer
- John Freeman-Mitford, 1st Baron Redesdale (1748–1830), English lawyer
- John Freeman-Mitford, 1st Earl of Redesdale (1805–1886)
- John Mitford (priest) (1781–1859), English clergyman and man of letters
- Mary Russell Mitford (1787–1855), British author and playwright as "Miss Mitford"
- Nancy Mitford (1904–1973), English novelist and biographer
- Pamela Mitford (1907–1994), Mitford sisters
- Richard Mitford (died 1407), English cleric and administrator
- Robert Mitford (1612–1674), English politician
- Robert Mitford (colonial official) (c.1782–1836), British colonial official in Bengal
- Rupert Bruce-Mitford (1914–1994), British archaeologist and scholar
- Rupert Mitford, 6th Baron Redesdale (born 1967), British peer and politician
- Terence Mitford (1905–1978), Scottish archaeologist and classicist
- Timothy Bruce Mitford, British Royal Navy officer and historian
- Tom Mitford (1909–1945), brother of the Mitford Sisters
- Unity Mitford (1914–1948), English supporter of fascism and Adolf Hitler
- William Mitford (1744–1827), English historian and the great-great-great-grandfather of the Mitford sisters
- William Mitford (singer-songwriter) (1788–1851), British writer of Tyneside songs
- William Kenyon Mitford (1857–1943), British Army officer, landowner and courtier
- William Townley Mitford (1817–1889), British politician

== See also ==
- Mitford family
- Mitford sisters: the six sisters Nancy, Pamela, Diana, Unity Valkyrie, Jessica and Deborah
