= Hartburn War Memorial =

World War I memorial in England

- United Kingdom
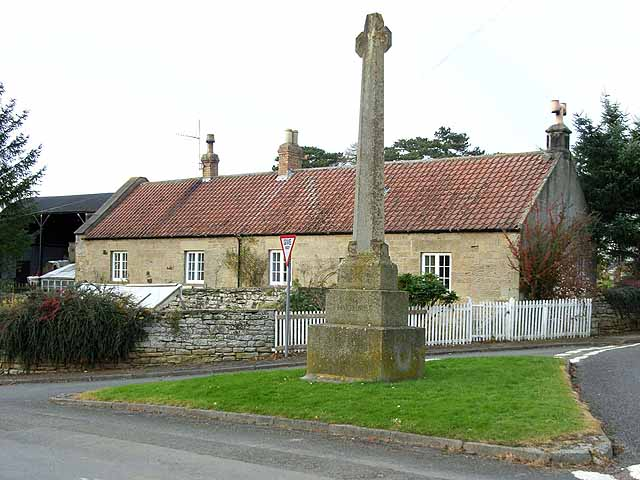
- For men from Hartburn killed in the First World War
- Unveiled: 31 July 1921
- Location: 55.168953°N 1.861983°W; Village green, Hartburn, Northumberland near Morpeth
- Designed by: Sir Edwin Lutyens

Listed Building – Grade II
- Official name: Hartburn War Memorial
- Designated: 30 January 1986
- Reference no.: 1042078

Hartburn War Memorial is a First World War Memorial in the village of Hartburn, Northumberland, in the north-east of England. The memorial, designed by Sir Edwin Lutyens, was unveiled in 1921 and is today a grade II listed building.

== Background ==
In the aftermath of the First World War and its unprecedented casualties, thousands of war memorials were built across Britain. Amongst the most prominent designers of memorials was the architect Sir Edwin Lutyens, described by Historic England as "the leading English architect of his generation". Lutyens designed the Cenotaph on Whitehall in London, which became the focus for the national Remembrance Sunday commemorations, as well as the Thiepval Memorial to the Missing—the largest British war memorial anywhere in the world—and the Stone of Remembrance which appears in all large Commonwealth War Graves Commission cemeteries and in several of Lutyens's civic war memorials. Hartburn's memorial is one of fifteen War Crosses by Lutyens, all sharing a broadly similar design.

Many of Lutyens' commissions for war memorials originated with pre-war clients and friends. The commission for Hartburn came from Mr and Mrs Straker of nearby Angerton Hall, the gardens of which Lutyens renovated with Gertrude Jekyll in 1904.

== History and design ==
The war memorial was built by HJ Robinson of Clay House in nearby Meldon. It was unveiled on 31 July 1921 by Colonel EPA Riddel, CMG, DSO, commander of the 149th (Northumberland) Brigade.

The memorial stands on a small triangular green in the middle of the village. It is one of Lutyens' fifteen War Crosses, the majority of which stand in small villages across England. Typical of Lutyens' War Crosses, it has a long, tapering shaft with short arms moulded near the top, though it has uncommonly deep bevelled edges and sits on a deep two-tiered stone base, which itself sits on a small stone circle in the grass. The main inscription is on the north face: "PASS FRIEND ALL IS WELL / 1914 HARTBURN 1919"; the inscription "1939 HARTBURN 1945" was added to the south face after the Second World War.

Hartburn War Memorial was designated a grade II listed building on 30 January 1986. In November 2015, as part of the commemorations of the centenary of the First World War, Lutyens's war memorials were recognised as a "national collection" and all of his free-standing memorials in England were listed or had their listing status reviewed and their National Heritage List for England list entries were updated and expanded.

== See also ==
- Holy Island War Memorial, a Lutyens war cross on Lindisfarne, elsewhere in Northumberland
