= At Home in Mitford =

Novel by Jan Karon

- First edition (UK)
- Author: Jan Karon
- Cover artist: Donna Kae Nelson
- Language: English
- Series: The Mitford Years
- Publisher: Doubleday (US); Lion Books (UK)
- Publication date: 1994
- Publication place: United States
- Media type: Print (hardback & paperback)
- Pages: 818 pp
- ISBN: 1-56865-347-6
- OCLC: 37584790
- Followed by: A Light in the Window

At Home in Mitford is a novel written by American author Jan Karon. It is book one of The Mitford Years series. The first edition (ISBN 1-56865-347-6) was published in hardcover format by Doubleday in 1994. Penguin Books published the paperback edition in 1996 (ISBN 0-140-25448-X).

== List of characters ==
- Father Tim Kavanagh: Anglican Rector of St. John's and the protagonist
- Cynthia Coppersmith: Author/illustrator of children's book, Father Tim's neighbor and romance interest
- Miss Sadie Baxter: Elderly, irrascible millionaire
- Barnabas: Father Tim's hulking dog, pacified by any bible verse
- Dooley Barlowe: a teen boy with an exceptional singing voice from the homeless community at Little Mitford Creek, abandoned by his mother Pauline and taken in by Father Tim
- Hoppy Harper: The town's medical doctor
- Miss Rose Watson: A schizophrenic woman who wears her deceased brother's military uniform to direct traffic in town
- Uncle Billy: Miss Rose's husband
- Emma Garrett: Tim's holier-than-thou part-time secretary
- Marge and Hal Owen: Father Tim's first friends in Mitford; great cooks and gardeners
- Olivia Davenport: A beautiful woman who moves to town for a heart transplant and later becomes Hoppy's wife.
- Percy Moseley: Owner of the only restaurant in town, a typical American greasy-spoon diner
- Velma Moseley: Percy's wife, cook, and waitress
- Mule Skinner: One of the regulars with Father Tim at Percy's Grill, a realtor, married to hairdresser Fancy.

== Adaptations ==
The novel was adapted into a 2017 television film airing on the Hallmark Channel.

Focus on the Family Radio Theatre produced an audio drama of At Home in Mitford in 2003.
