= Telford Bridge =

Telford bridge usually refers to a bridge whose design was overseen by the late-18th/early-19th century Scottish civil engineer Thomas Telford.The bridge was built by local engineer Thomas King. An (incomplete) list of these may be found here. Among those Telford bridges known by the name Telford Bridge are:

- the bridge crossing the River Moriston near Invermoriston in Scotland (completed 1813).
- the bridge crossing the River Wansbeck in Morpeth, Northumberland, also known as "Morpeth Telford Bridge" (completed 1831).
