= Out to Canaan =

1997 novel by Jan Karon

- First edition cover
- Author: Jan Karon
- Genre: Religious fiction
- Publisher: Viking Press
- Publication date: May 1, 1997
- ISBN: 0-670-87485-X

Out to Canaan is a 1997 religious fiction novel by American author Jan Karon. It is the fourth book of The Mitford Years series.

== Plot ==
Out to Canaan (the fourth book in the Mitford Years series) focuses on Father Tim Kavanagh and his wife Cynthia as they approach retirement in the small town of Mitford.

== Characters ==
- Father Tim
- Cynthia
- Barnabas
- Dooley Barlowe
- Lace
