= River Font =

River in Northumberland, England

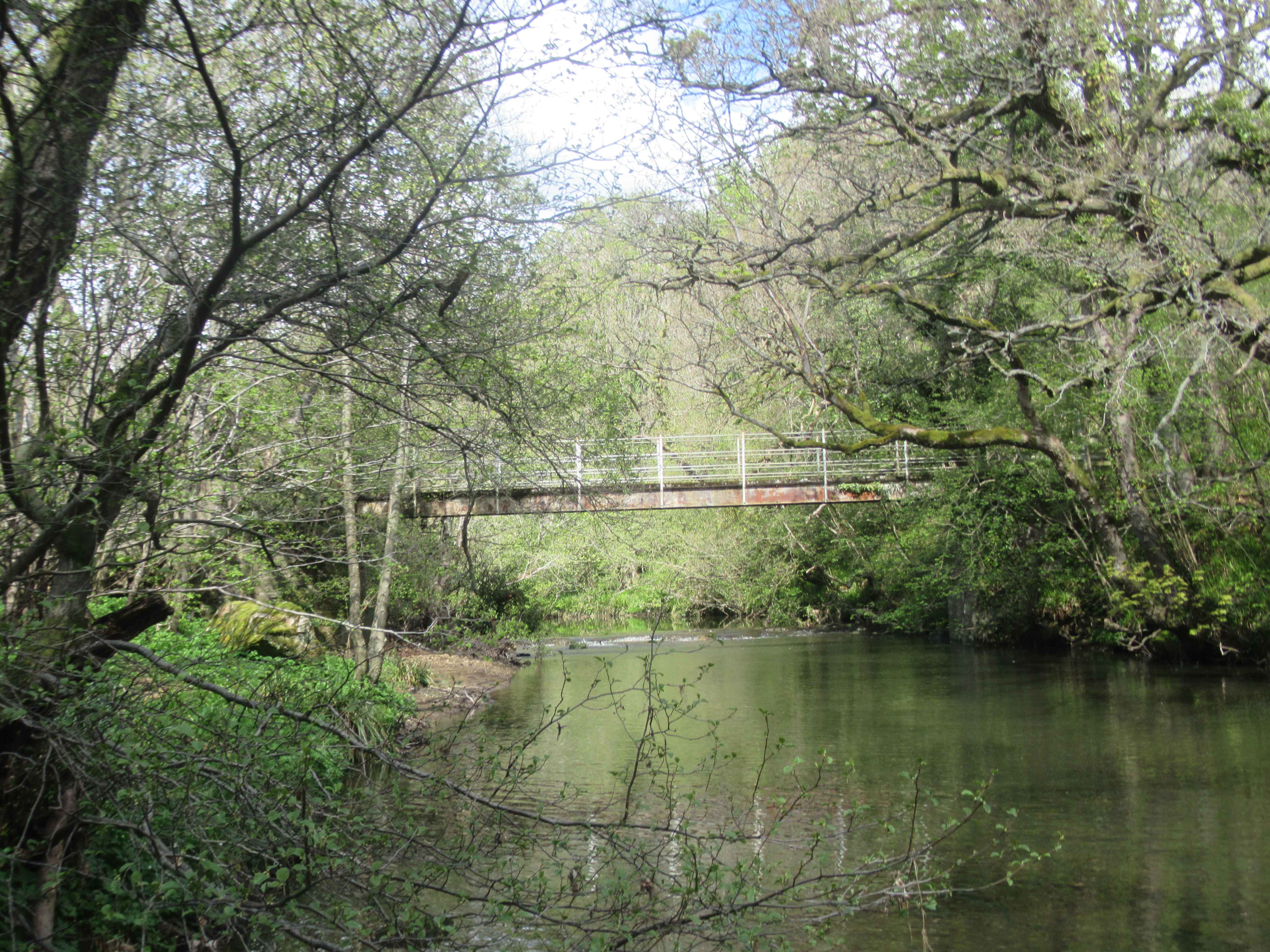
- River Font near Mitford

- Location of the mouth within Northumberland

Location
- Country: United Kingdom
- County: Northumberland

Physical characteristics
- Mouth
  - location: River Wansbeck
  - coordinates: 55.1671°N 1.7293°W
- Length: 40 km (25 mi)
- Basin size: 104 km^{2} (40 sq mi)

The River Font is a river that flows through Northumberland, England. The river is a tributary of the River Wansbeck which it joins at Mitford.
