= Hartburn, Northumberland =

Village in Northumberland, England

Coordinates: 55.168°N 1.862°W

Hartburn
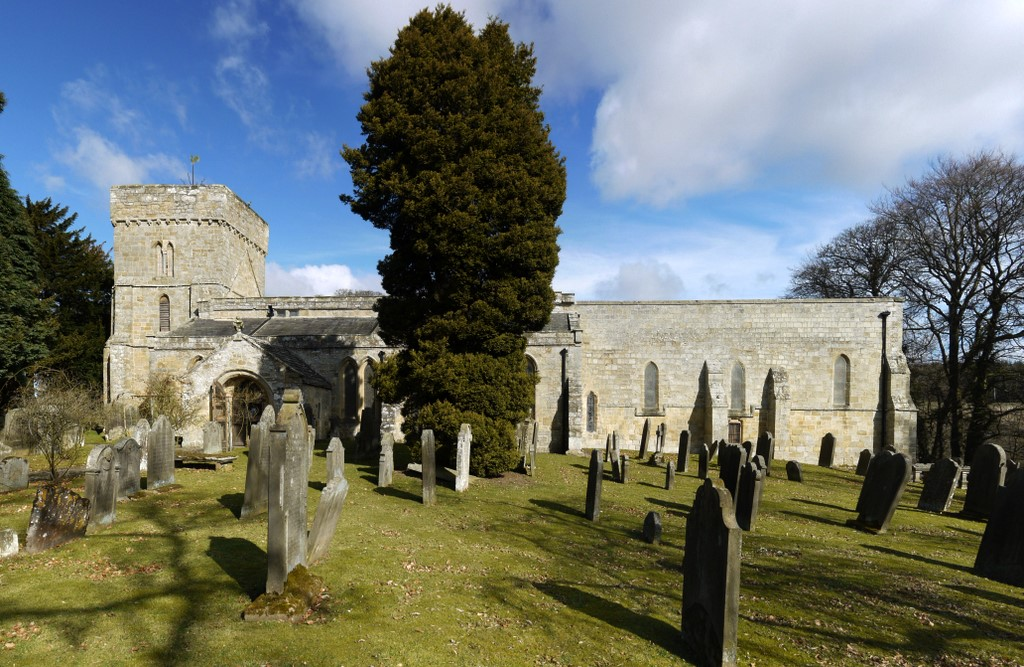
- St. Andrew's Church, Hartburn

- Location within Northumberland
- Population: 194 (2011 census)
- OS grid reference: NZ088860
- Unitary authority: Northumberland
- Ceremonial county: Northumberland
- Region: North East
- Country: England
- Sovereign state: United Kingdom
- Post town: BERWICK UPON TWEED
- Postcode district: NE61
- Dialling code: 01670
- Police: Northumbria
- Fire: Northumberland
- Ambulance: North East
- UK Parliament: Wansbeck

Hartburn is a village in Northumberland, in England. It is situated about 6 miles (10 km) to the west of Morpeth. The population at the 2011 census was 194.

The place-name 'Hartburn' is first attested in Charter Rolls of 1198, where it appears as Herteburne. The name means 'stag stream'.

The village is on the Hart Burn river, which a couple of miles downstream joins the River Wansbeck, which flows through Morpeth and Ashington to the sea.

== Landmarks ==
The Devil's Causeway passes the western edge of the village, just before its crosses the Hart river (burn). The causeway was a Roman road which started at Portgate on Hadrian's Wall, north of Corbridge, and extended 55 miles (89 km) northwards across Northumberland to the mouth of the River Tweed at Berwick-upon-Tweed.

To the north of the village lies Hartburn Glebe, an area of woodland alongside the river Hart Burn currently in the care of the Woodland Trust. This small woodland has been described as one of the best British woods for views. A cave, known as Hartburn Grotto, was modified by an 18th-century Vicar of Hartburn (Dr John Sharpe) as a changing area for ladies wishing to bathe in the river. Above the tall entrance are cavities that once housed statues of Adam and Eve. Near the grotto there are postholes carved in the stone of the river-bed, which show where the Roman bridge crossed the river. Leading down to them is a sunken track called The Cut, which has been claimed to be the true line of the Devil's Causeway – its actual route through Hartburn is disputed. Possibly there were two routes through the woods, both now marked by sunken lanes, the western one pre-dating the building of the bridge, and the eastern one post-dating it.

Dr John Sharpe also built the crenellated Tower House that overlooks Hartburn Glebe. It was built as a village school, accommodation for the schoolmaster, and as a stable for the parish hearse in 1745. The north face of the house is built in an 18th-century Gothic style whilst the south face, with its stairs up the outside, resembles a large Northumbrian bastle house.

The Old Vicarage in Hartburn is at heart a Northumbrian pele tower, with later additions including an 18th-century library wing added by Dr John Sharpe.

The field opposite the old school and school house shows evidence of there being an ancient settlement, and old folklore says that the large solitary stone is what is left of the ancient village cross. Another local folklore tale is that the deep water of the Hart downstream from the Grotto is where the village baker secreted his money in a chest; to this day this deep pool is termed 'the Baker's Chest'.

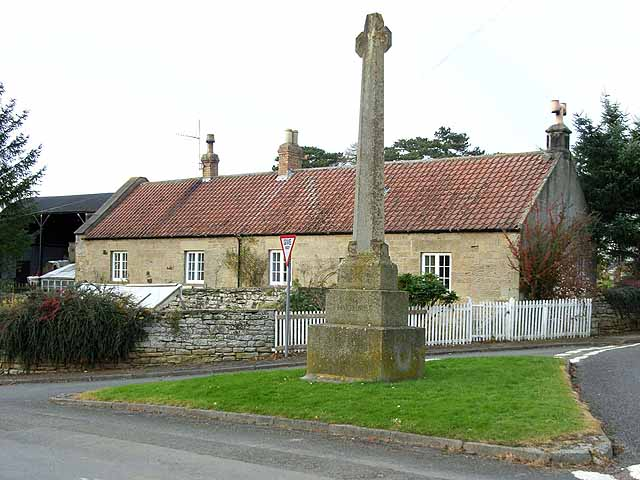
Hartburn War Memorial

Hartburn War Memorial was designed by renowned architect Sir Edwin Lutyens to his War Cross design. It was commissioned by Mr and Mrs Straker of nearby Angerton Hall, whose gardens Lutyens renovated in 1904, and unveiled on 31 July 1921. It is a grade II listed building.

== Religious sites ==
The village church is the parish church of St Andrew, a Grade I listed building, Norman architecture with some medieval alterations. Marks perhaps carved into the doorpost by the Knights Templar, who may have used the church in the 13th century, are still visible.

According to the architectural historian Sir Nikolaus Pevsner, in the churchyard there is "the best collection in the county of well-preserved C18 headstones, many carved on both faces. Cherubs, death's heads and various mortality emblems abound."
