= Mitford Old Manor House =

Manor house in Mitford, Northumberland, England

Coordinates: 55°9′50″N 1°44′16″W

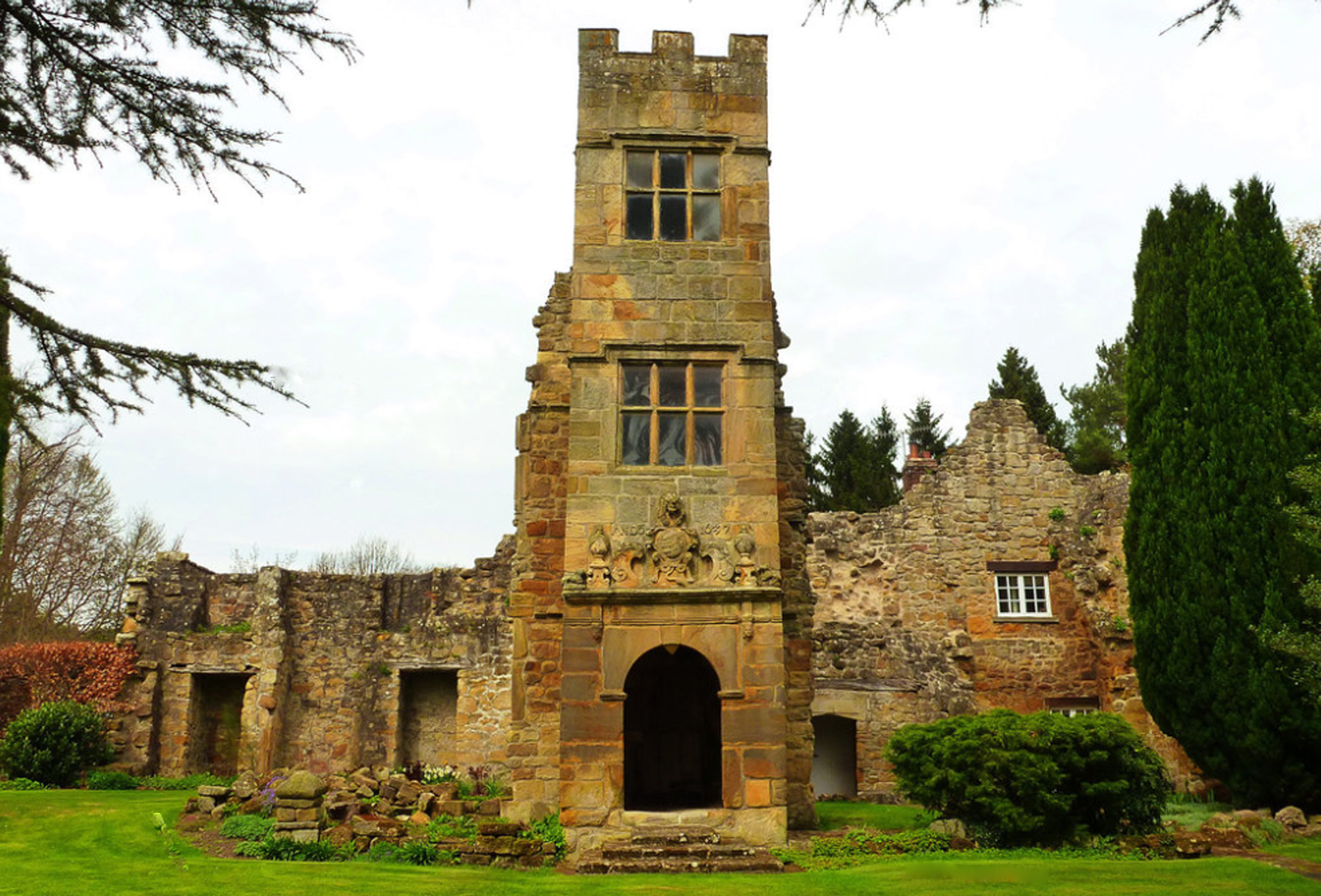
Ruins of Mitford Old Manor House

Mitford Old Manor House is an historic English manor house at Mitford, Northumberland, and is a Grade II* listed building. The Manor of Mitford was held from ancient times by the Mitford family.

The Manor House previously stood, adjacent to the old church of St Mary Magdalene, on the eastern side of the River Wansbeck. The substantial ruins now standing on the site represent the remains of a 16th-century house and of a porch tower built in about 1637.

The original house was substantially demolished and rebuilt in about 1810, then abandoned by the Mitfords when they built a new mansion house, Mitford Hall, and park on the opposite bank of the river in 1828. In about 1960 a modern house was created out of the kitchen wing.

== History ==
An early description of the ruin was given in about 1824 by Eneas Mackenzie, who said that the greater part of the building had been taken down about 12 years ago by Bertram Mitford (1777–1842) who was intending to build a new house across the river. This means that it was probably dismantled in about 1812. He mentioned that the kitchen which still remained was occupied by the gardener.

A similar statement was made by John Hodgson who wrote about Mitford Manor in 1832, who said "the greater part of this seat- house was taken away about twenty years since" (that is 1812). He described what was standing in about 1830 in the following terms.

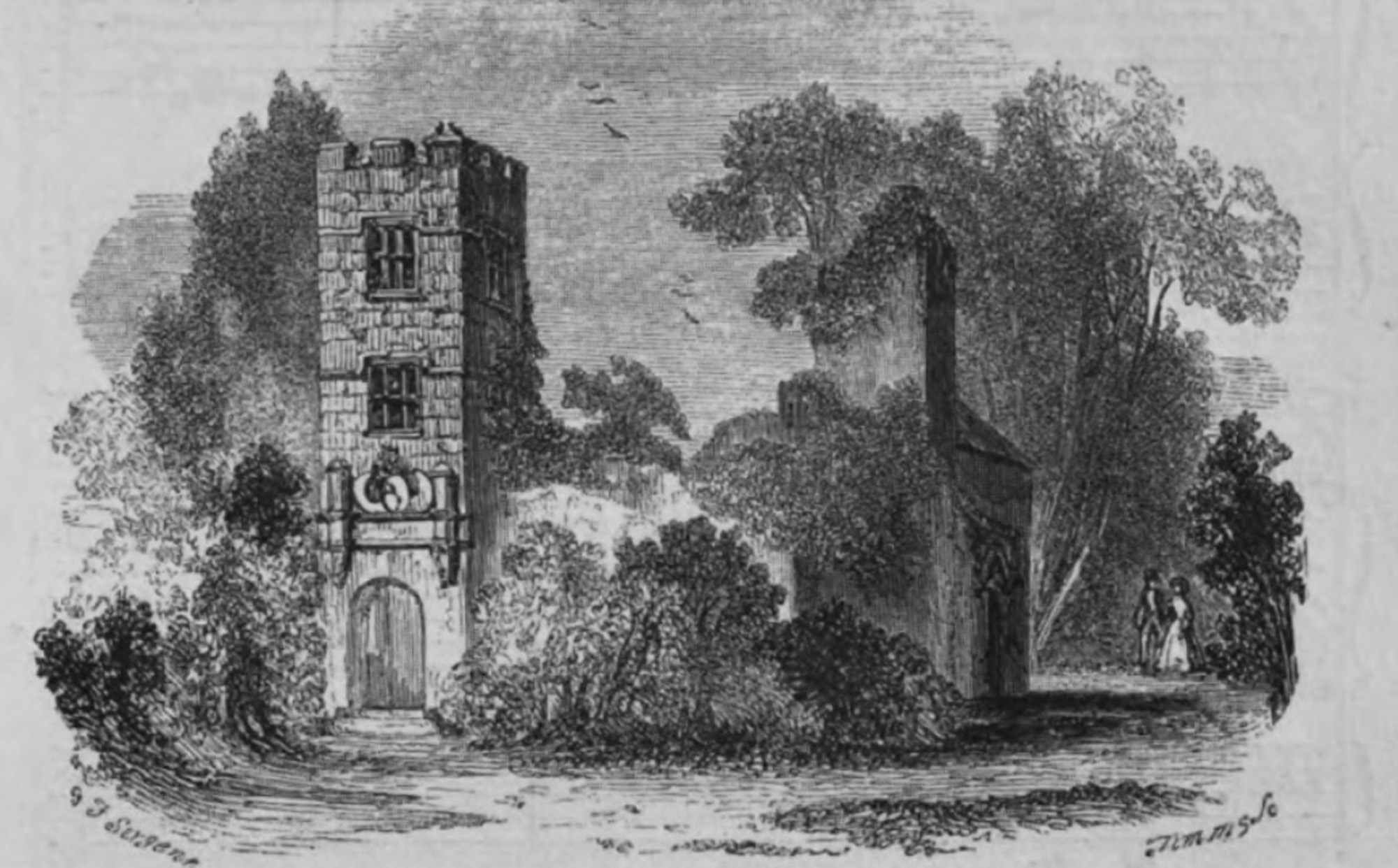
Mitford Manor House in 1842

"The mansion-house, of which the turreted porch and part of the kitchen and offices still remain, were probably first occupied by the Mitford family when they acquired an accession of property here in the time of Philip and Mary [i.e. about 1550] and the tower, and other additions might be made to it in 1637 which is the date of the tablet above the door bearing the arms of Mitford empaling Wharton."

The 1637 additions were made by Robert Mitford (1612–1674) and his wife Philadelphia Wharton. Robert was born in 1612. He was the only son of Cuthbert Mitford who owned the Mitford estate. He attended Sidney Sussex College, Cambridge and became a lawyer. In about 1631 he married Philadelphia Wharton, who was the daughter of Humphrey Wharton of Gillingwood. In 1659 he was elected to Parliament as the Member for Morpeth. He died in 1674 and was succeeded by his eldest son Humphrey Mitford. The property descended through the Mitford family until it came into the possession of Bertram Mitford and his wife Frances.

In 1812 Bertram partially demolished the house and from then it became the residence of the gardener. One of the first gardeners was Bartholomew Harbottle (1777–1862) who was mentioned in 1825 as being in Mitford, Northumberland. He was a bachelor and is shown as living in the Manor House in both the 1851 and 1861 census. There is an elaborate grave in the churchyard of St Mary Magdalene which is in his honour. The inscription says: "In memory of Bartholomew Harbottle who died March 31st 1862 aged 86. Having been for the last 46 years of his life the trusted servant of the Mitford family."

In 1842 William Howitt visited Mitford and gave the following description of the Manor House where Bartholomew now lived. He said.

"But the view of the old Manor-house pleased me even still more as I approached it. Its battlemented tower, with large mullioned windows boarded up, and converted into a dovecote; the arched entrance below, with the family escutcheon over it, and the beehives seen within it; the broken walls; the old yew trees about it; the part converted into a tenement covered with ivy, with its ancient porch supported on two stone pillars; the simple garden; the orchard; the walks clean swept; the lofty trees overhanging, — realized all that the poetry of rural life has feigned or imaged forth from such beautiful realities as this. As I stood and gazed on it, in silent admiration, the man who lives in the part tenanted came out with a corn measure, and whistling his pigeons, they flew down around him in the orchard, and completed the picture."

Other gardeners who lived at the Manor House were William Duncan (1871 census) and George Douglass and his wife Margaret, who are recorded in both the 1901 and 1911 census.

== See also ==
Mitford Castle

== Gallery ==
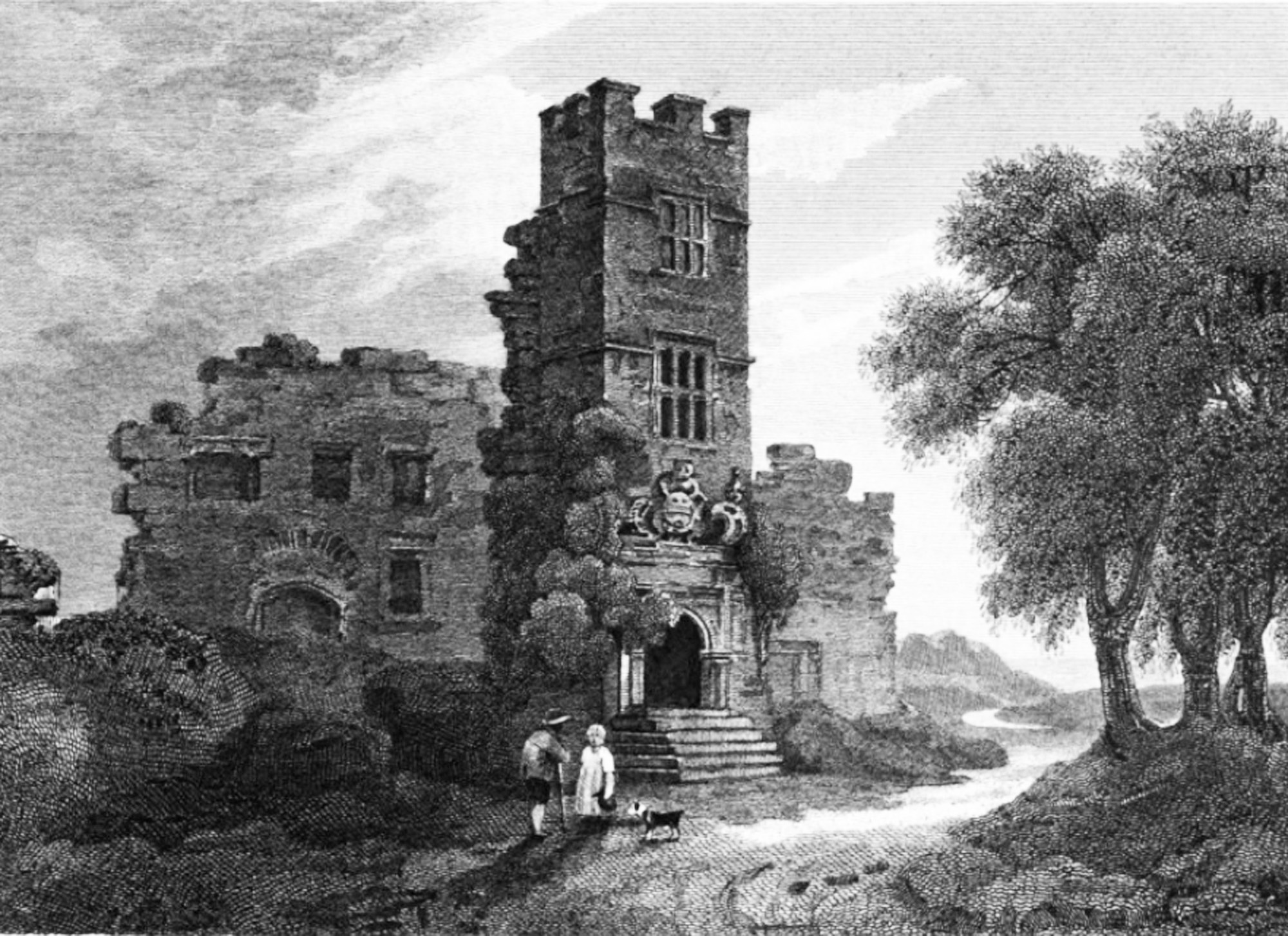
Engraving of Mitford Manor House in 1814

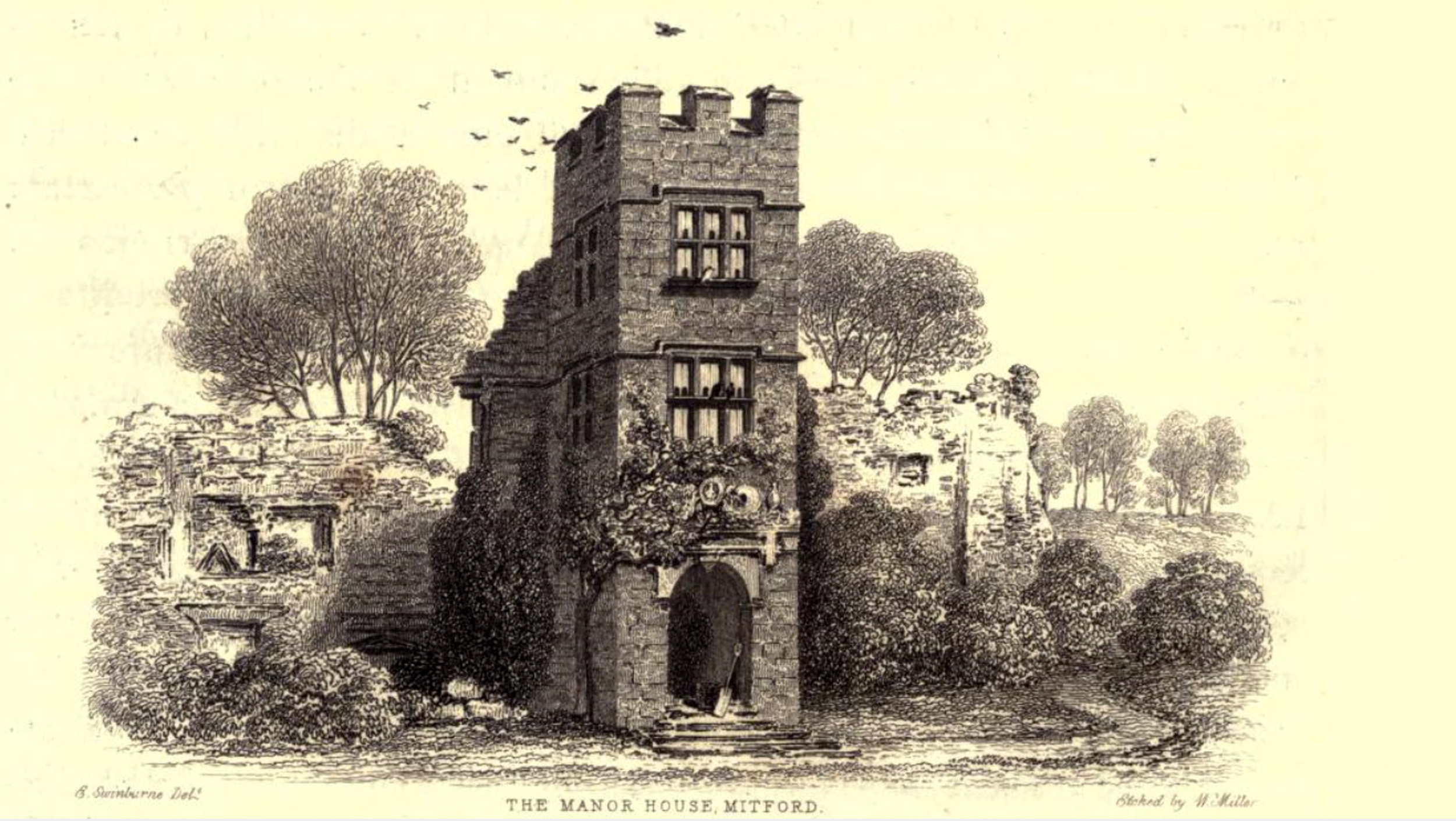
Engraving of Mitford Manor House in 1828

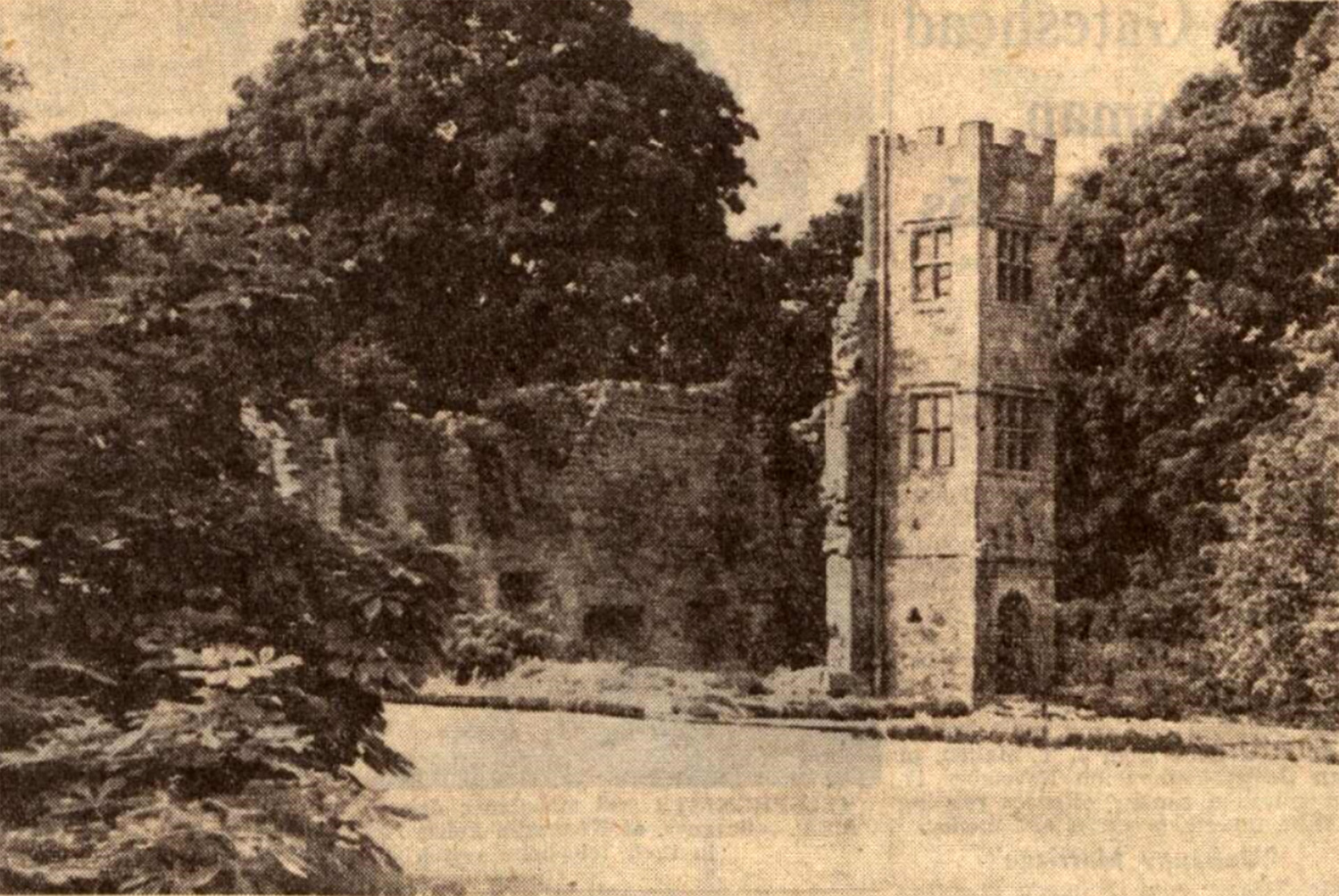
Photo of Mitford Manor House in 1939

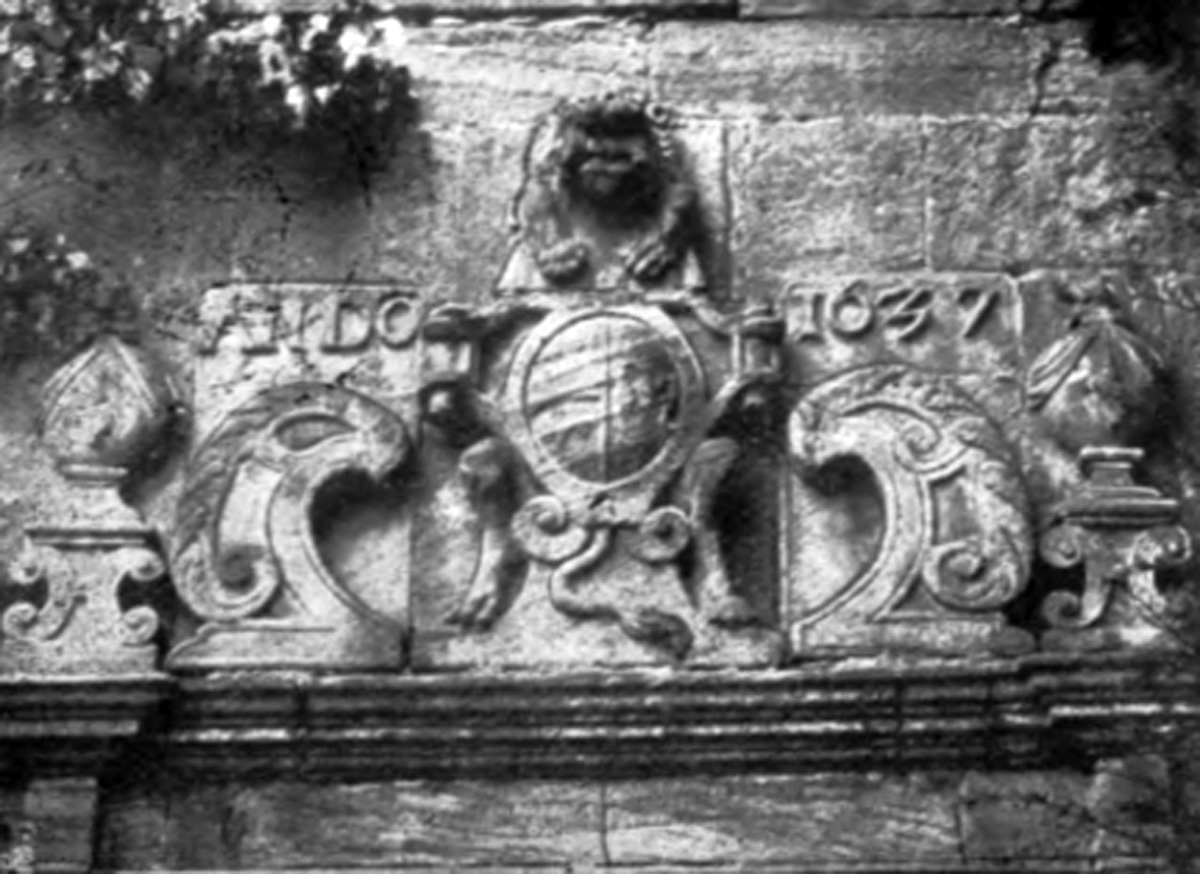
Photo of the coat of arms taken in 1930
