= Kirkwhelpington =

Village in Northumberland, England

Coordinates: 55.155°N 2.005°W

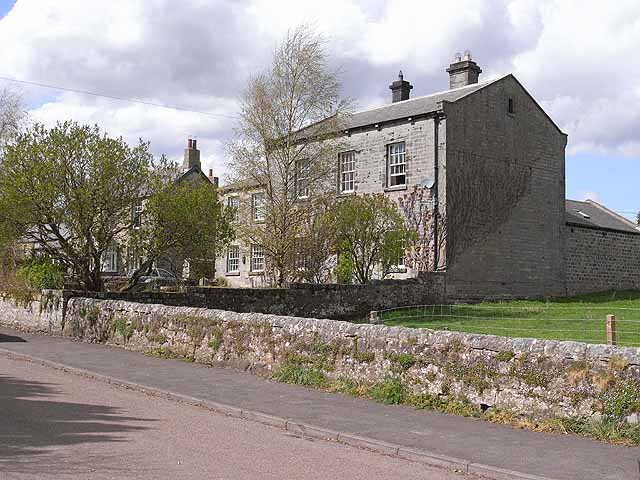
- Old courthouse at Kirkwhelpington

- Location within Northumberland
- Population: 460 (2011(including Bavington))
- OS grid reference: NY997844
- Unitary authority: Northumberland
- Ceremonial county: Northumberland
- Region: North East
- Country: England
- Sovereign state: United Kingdom
- Post town: NEWCASTLE UPON TYNE
- Postcode district: NE19
- Dialling code: 01830
- Police: Northumbria
- Fire: Northumberland
- Ambulance: North East
- UK Parliament: Hexham

Kirkwhelpington is a village and civil parish in the English county of Northumberland about 13 miles (21 km) northeast of Hexham. It is on the River Wansbeck alongside the A696 trunk road between Otterburn and Ponteland.

== History ==
Kirkwhelpington has medieval origins and is an abortive market town. The lord, Gilbert de Umfraville, obtained a market charter from King Henry III but lost its privileges on the grounds of non-usage. He had a bridge built over the Wansbeck to improve its communications.

== Economy ==
There was a mine at Kirkwhelpington (Lead ore).

== Landmarks ==
The Memorial Hall was built in 1924 as a memorial to the men of the village and district who gave their lives in the First World War. Money for this was raised locally with the Duke of Northumberland donating the land. The Post Office is now in the hall and the weekly activities include a Youth Club, Toddler Group, and a Bowls Club. The monthly meetings include the Parish Council, The Royal British Legion Women's Section, and an Art Club.

The village school was built in 1858 and closed in 1972. Northumberland County Council Education Committee used the premises as a Girl Guide holiday centre. This has now been converted to a private house.

The Methodist Church was built in 1870 and closed in 1995/96. It was bought by a villager and is now used for exhibitions of paintings and other art work.

Sweethope Loughs are two freshwater lakes almost 1 mile (1.6 km) in length, 4 miles (6 km) west of Kirkwhelpington, and a renowned fishing location stocked with large rainbow trout. Sweethope Lough boasts good access to those anglers with disabilities, and annually hosts The Viscount Devonport Sweethope Challenge for Disabled Anglers.

== Religious sites ==
St Bartholomew, a thirteenth-century (or earlier) building, with its low, broad Perpendicular tower and long nave and chancel, was altered in the fifteenth century and then in 1896. Excavations have revealed that the building originally had aisles and transepts. There are two fourteenth-century bells, a seventeenth-century font (which rests on the reversed capital of a fourteenth or fifteenth-century pier) and a mahogany pulpit from 1797. The glass includes work by Heaton, Butler and Bayne (1909 and 1914).

== Exhibitions etc ==
The Kirkwhelpington and District Show is held on the first Saturday in September every year. This is an exhibition of horticultural and craft work with home baking and children's exhibits. On one of the Sundays during July six or seven local gardens are open to the public in aid of charity.

== Notable people ==
- The celebrated antiquary John Hodgson wrote his History of Northumberland during his incumbency between 1823 and 1834.
- The distinguished engineer and inventor Sir Charles Parsons is buried here with his wife Lady Katherine Parsons (there is a memorial to them in the church). They lived at Ray Demesne, as did their daughter Rachel Parsons.
- John Stevens, Baron Stevens of Kirkwhelpington, whose career included head of the Metropolitan Police Service, and Chancellor of Northumbria University.
