= Sweethope Loughs =

Freshwater lakes in Northumberland, England

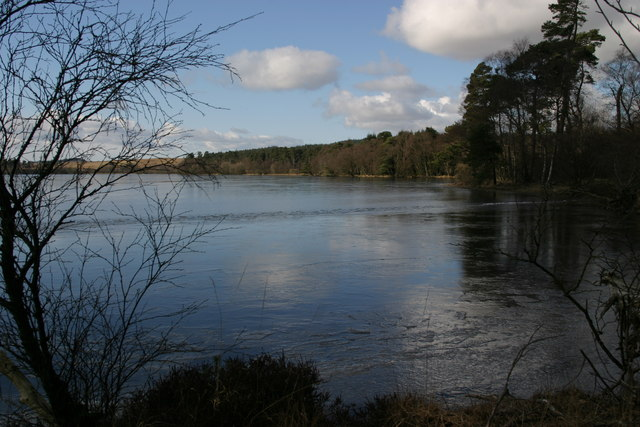
- East end of Sweethope Lough

- Location in Northumberland
- Location: Northumberland, England, UK
- Coordinates: 55.137°N 2.092°W grid reference NY942825
- Basin countries: United Kingdom

Sweethope Loughs are two freshwater lakes almost 1 mile (1.6 km) in length, the smaller one just east of the larger, in the southern part of Northumberland, England and lying between the A68 road, and the A696 road. They lie about 18 miles (29 km) west of Morpeth; 4 miles (6 km) west of Kirkwhelpington; and 6 miles (10 km) east of Bellingham. There is a crossing between the two lakes, which are lined with trees and surrounded by hills. To the north west are Great Wanney Crag and Little Wanney Crag. The larger lough has a surface area of 46.293 ha and a mean depth of 2.043 m, a catchment area of 618 ha, and is situated at 238 m altitude.

== Sweethope Loughs road bridge ==
At the west end of Sweethope Loughs is the first bridge, actually a culvert, on the River Wansbeck and crossed by the minor road going west from Knowesgate to the A68 road. It was constructed in 1972 and is a concrete pipe with masonry headwalls and crosses the narrow river only a few feet wide. The river continues for a mile or so further west on the moors where it rises at a height of about a thousand feet.

== Fishing ==
Sweethope Lough is a renowned fishing location stocked with large rainbow trout, suitable for every angler, from novice to expert. Sweethope Lough boasts good access to those anglers with disabilities, and annually hosts The Viscount Devonport Sweethope Challenge for Disabled Anglers.

== See also ==
- Great Wanney
- River Wansbeck
