= Hart Burn =

River in England

Coordinates: 55°09′35″N 1°49′50″W

Hart Burn is a river that flows through Northumberland, England. It is a tributary of the River Wansbeck, is 24 km long and has a catchment area of 45 km squared.

== Course ==
Hart Burn forms at the confluence of Ottercops Burn and Birky Burn just north-west of Raechester and south-west of Harwood. The river then proceeds south-east through/near Hartington Hall, Rothley, Scots' Gap, and Hartburn (river's name origin), before feeding into the River Wansbeck near Meldon Park.

== Major Tributaries ==
From Source to Mouth:

- Fairnley Burn
- Chesters Burn
- Holy Burn
- Delf Burn
- Angerton Lake
- Dean Burn
