= Mitford family =

English aristocratic and literary family

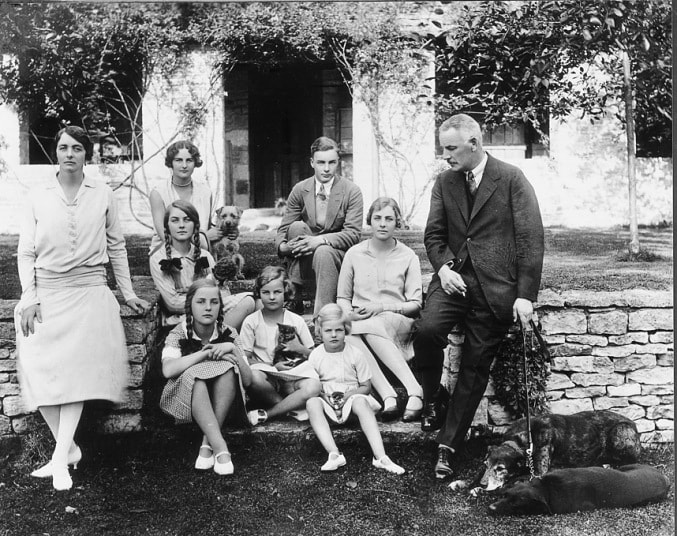
The Mitford family in 1928

The Mitford family is an aristocratic British family who became particularly well known in the 1930s for the six Mitford sisters, the daughters of David Freeman-Mitford, 2nd Baron Redesdale, and his wife, Sydney Bowles. (Note: Daughter of Thomas Gibson Bowles) They were celebrated and sometimes scandalous figures. One journalist described them as "Diana the Fascist, Jessica the Communist, Unity the Hitler-lover, Nancy the Novelist, Deborah the Duchess and Pamela the unobtrusive poultry connoisseur."

== Background ==
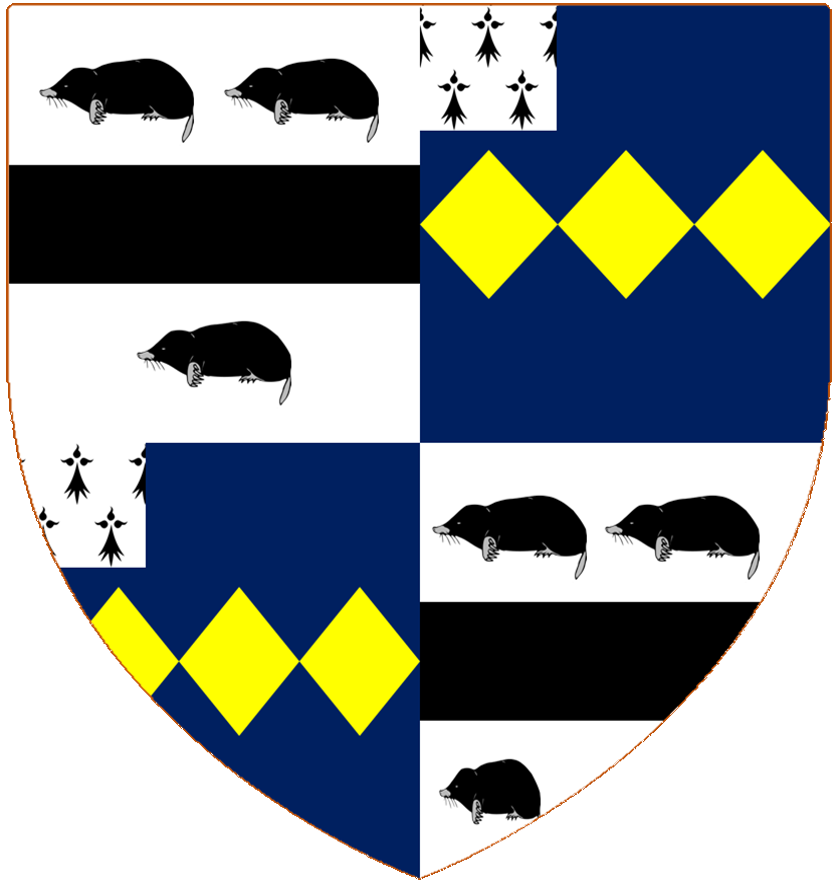
Arms of Freeman-Mitford

The family traces its origins in Northumberland back to the time of the Norman Conquest. In the Middle Ages they had been border reivers based in Redesdale. The main line had its family seat first at Mitford Castle, then Mitford Old Manor House, prior to building Mitford Hall in 1828. All three are near Mitford, Northumberland. Several heads of the family served as High Sheriff of Northumberland.

A junior line, with seats at Newton Park, Northumberland, and Exbury House, Hampshire, descends via the historian William Mitford (1744–1827) and were twice elevated to the British peerage, in 1802 and 1902, under the title Baron Redesdale. This branch of the family, to whom the Mitford sisters belonged, were seated at Batsford Park, Gloucestershire, and then at Asthall Manor and Swinbrook, in Oxfordshire.

== Mitford siblings ==
- Nancy Mitford (28 November 1904 – 30 June 1973) married Peter Rodd, whom she subsequently divorced, and had a longstanding relationship with French politician and statesman Gaston Palewski. She lived in France for much of her adult life. She wrote many novels, including the semi-autobiographical The Pursuit of Love and Love in a Cold Climate. She was also a biographer of historical figures, including the Sun King.
- Pamela "Pam" Mitford (25 November 1907 – 12 April 1994) was called "Woman" by her siblings. John Betjeman, who for a time was in love with her, referred to her as the "Rural Mitford". She married and later divorced millionaire physicist Derek Jackson, and spent much of the 1960s living with Giuditta Tommasi (died 1993), an Italian horsewoman.
- Thomas David "Tom" Mitford (2 January 1909 – 30 March 1945), the only son, was educated at Eton, where he had an affair with James Lees-Milne. He later had a lengthy affair with Austrian Jewish dancer Tilly Losch during her marriage to Edward James. According to Jessica's letters, Thomas supported British fascism and was posted to the Burma campaign after he had refused to fight in Europe. He died in action.
- Diana Mitford (17 June 1910 – 11 August 2003) married aristocrat and writer Bryan Guinness, 2nd Baron Moyne, in 1929. She left him in 1933 for British fascist leader Oswald Mosley, whom she married in 1936 and with whom she had two sons, Alexander and Max Mosley. The couple were interned in Holloway Prison from May 1940 until November 1943.
- Unity Valkyrie Mitford (8 August 1914 – 28 May 1948) was known as "Bobo" to her siblings. She and her sister, Jessica, called each other "Boud" and developed their own language which they called “Boudledidge”. Her adulation of, and friendship with, Adolf Hitler was widely publicised. She shot herself in the head just hours after Britain declared war on Germany, surviving, but with permanent brain damage. In 1944 her family sent her to the Scottish islet of Inch Kenneth, where she lived out the war. She died of pneumococcal meningitis at West Highland Cottage Hospital, Oban.
- Jessica Lucy "Decca" Mitford (11 September 1917 – 23 July 1996), called "Boud" by her sister Unity whom she also called by the same name. Unlike the rest of her family, she was a communist. She eloped with Esmond Romilly to Spain to participate in the Civil War; they subsequently moved to the United States. On 30 November 1941, during an air raid on Hamburg, Romilly's aircraft was lost over the North Sea with all on board. She remained in the U.S. most of her adult life, where she married Robert Treuhaft and was a member of the American Communist Party until 1958. She wrote several volumes of memoirs and several volumes of polemical investigation, including the best-selling The American Way of Death (1963) about the funeral industry. She was the grandmother of James Forman Jr. and Chaka Forman, sons of the African-American civil rights leader James Forman by her daughter Constancia Romilly.
- Deborah Vivien "Debo" Mitford (31 March 1920 – 24 September 2014) was nicknamed "Nine" by her sister Nancy (Debo's supposed mental age). She married Andrew Cavendish (1920—2004), who later became the Duke of Devonshire, and with him turned his ancestral home Chatsworth House into one of Britain's most successful stately homes. She wrote several books.

== Mitford sisters ==
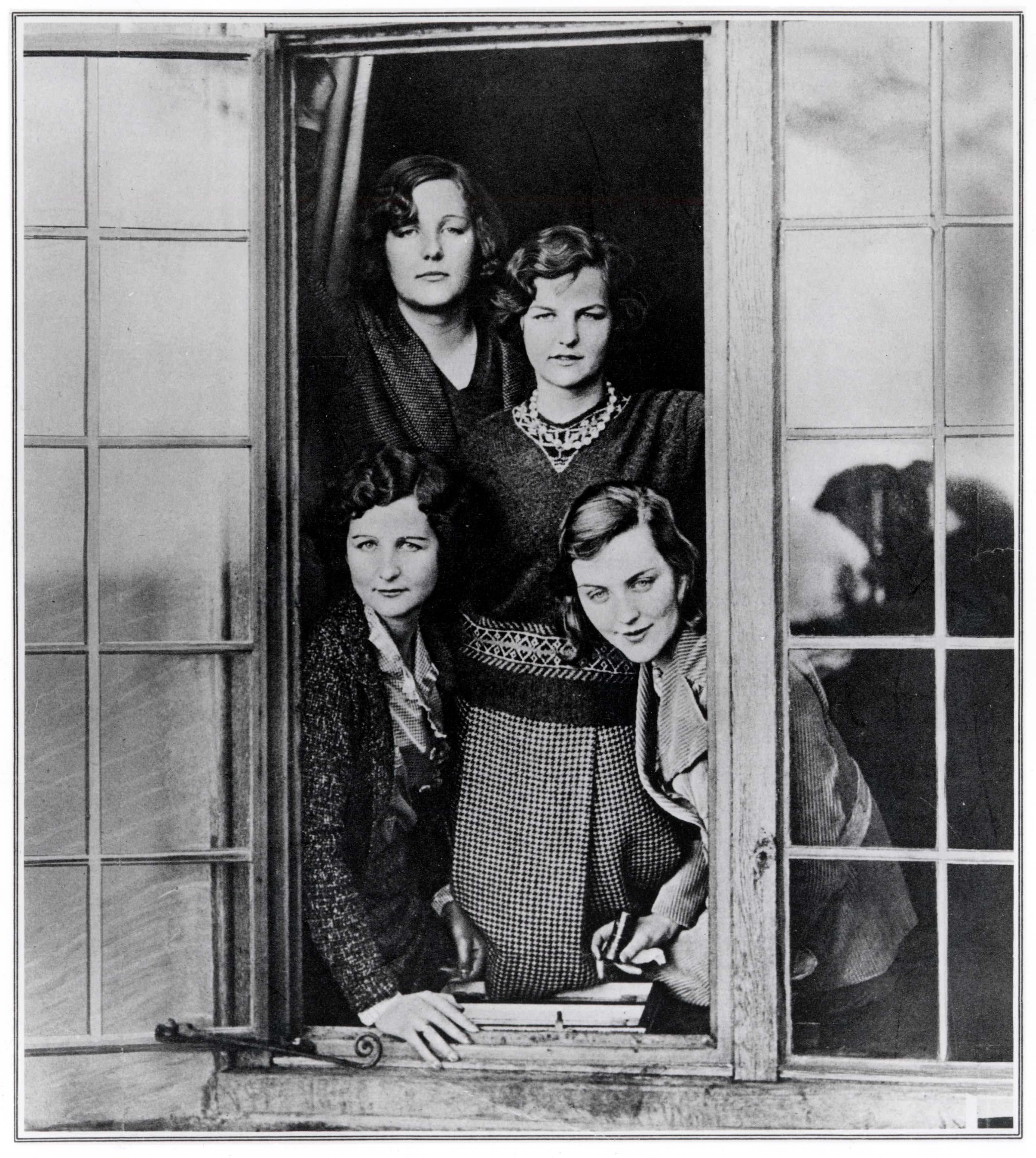
Cover of The Sketch, 1932

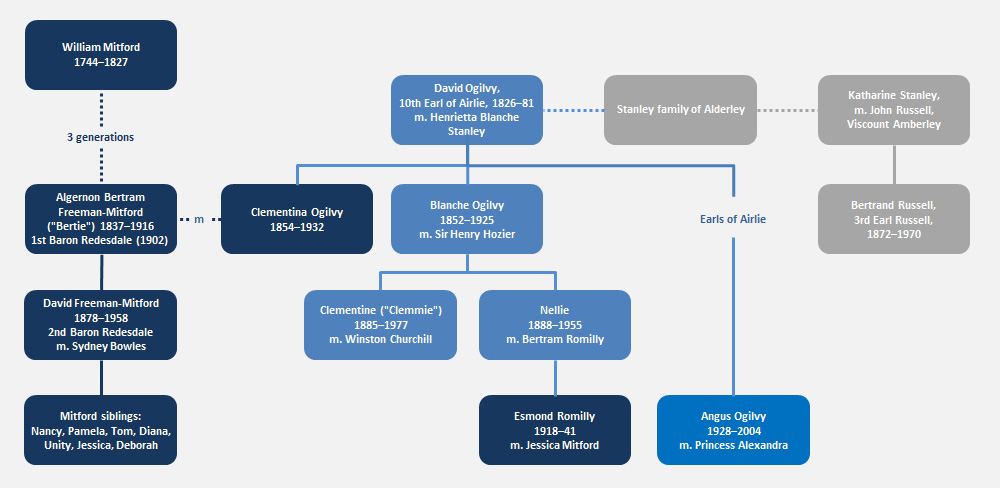
Family tree

The sisters gained widespread attention for their stylish and controversial lives as young people, and for their public political divisions between communism and fascism. Nancy and Jessica became well-known writers: Nancy wrote The Pursuit of Love (1945) and Love in a Cold Climate (1949), and Jessica The American Way of Death (1963). Deborah managed Chatsworth House, one of the most successful stately homes in the United Kingdom.

Jessica and Deborah married nephews of prime ministers Winston Churchill and Harold Macmillan, respectively. Deborah and Diana both married wealthy aristocrats. Unity and Diana were well known during the 1930s for being close to Adolf Hitler. Jessica turned her back on her inherited privileges and eloped with her cousin, Esmond Romilly, who was hoping to report on the Spanish Civil War for the News Chronicle, having briefly fought with the International Brigade. Jessica's memoir, Hons and Rebels, describes their upbringing. Nancy drew upon her family members for characters in her novels.

The sisters and their brother Thomas were the children of David Freeman-Mitford, 2nd Baron Redesdale and his wife Sydney, the daughter of Thomas Bowles. To their children, they were known as "Farve" and "Muv". David and Sydney married in 1904. The family homes changed from Batsford House to Asthall Manor beside the River Windrush in Oxfordshire, and then Swinbrook Cottage nearby, with a house at Rutland Gate in London. They also lived in a cottage in High Wycombe, Buckinghamshire, which they used as a summer residence.

The siblings grew up in an aristocratic country house with emotionally distant parents and a large household with numerous servants. This family dynamic was not unusual for upper-class families of the time. The parents disregarded formal education of women of the family, and they were expected to marry at a young age to a prosperous husband. The children had a private language called "Boudledidge" (/ˈboʊdəldɪdʒ/), and each had a different nickname for the others.

After the Nazi regime started the invasion of Poland, the Second World War began and their political views came into sharper relief. "Farve" remained a conservative who had long favoured Neville Chamberlain's approach of appeasing Nazi Germany. Once Britain declared war on Germany, he returned to being an anti-German British patriot. "Muv" continued her fascist sympathies and usually supported her fascist children. The couple separated in 1943 as a result of this conflict.

Nancy, a moderate socialist, worked in London during the Blitz and informed on her fascist siblings to the British authorities. Pamela remained seemingly non-political, although according to her sister Nancy, Pamela and Derek Jackson were virulent anti-Semites verbally during World War II, who had called for all Jews in England to be killed, and wanted an early end to the war with Nazi Germany before England lost any more money.

Diana married Sir Oswald Mosley, leader of the British Union of Fascists, and was imprisoned in London from May 1940 until November 1943 under Defence Regulation 18B.

Unity, fanatically devoted to Hitler and Nazism, was distraught over Britain's war declaration against Germany on 3 September 1939, and attempted suicide later that day by shooting herself in the head. She survived the suicide attempt, but suffered brain damage that—after a return to Britain via Switzerland, facilitated by Hitler despite the war—eventually led to her early death in 1948.

Jessica, a communist, had moved to the U.S., but her husband Esmond Romilly, a Republican veteran from the Spanish Civil War who volunteered for the Royal Canadian Air Force in World War II, died in 1941 when his bomber developed mechanical problems over the North Sea and went down. In many letters Jessica said that her daughter Constancia received a pension from the Canadian government after Esmond's death until she turned 18.

The strong political rift between Jessica and Diana left them estranged from 1936 until their deaths, although they did speak to each other in 1973, as their eldest sister Nancy was on her deathbed. Aside from Jessica and Diana's estrangement, the sisters kept in frequent contact with each other in the decades after World War II. The sisters were prolific letter-writers, and a substantial body of correspondence still exists, principally letters between them.

== Ancestry ==
Ancestors of the Mitford siblings

8. Henry Reveley Mitford
4. Bertram Freeman-Mitford, 1st Baron Redesdale
9. Lady Georgiana Jemima Ashburnham
2. David Freeman-Mitford, 2nd Baron Redesdale
10. David Ogilvy, 10th Earl of Airlie
5. Lady Clementine Ogilvy
11. Hon. Blanche Stanley
1. the Mitford siblings
12. Thomas Milner Gibson
6. Thomas Gibson Bowles
13. Susannah Bowles
3. Sydney Bowles
14. Maj.-Gen. Charles Evans-Gordon
7. Jessica Evans-Gordon
15. Catherine Rose

== In popular culture ==
- Nancy Mitford's 1949 novel, Love in a Cold Climate, which was based on the family, was serialised by Thames Television in 1980 and by the BBC in 2001. Her novel The Pursuit of Love was serialised by the BBC in 2021.
- The daughters were the subject of a 1981 musical, The Mitford Girls, by Caryl Brahms and Ned Sherrin, and of a song, "The Mitford Sisters", by Luke Haines.
- A fictional family based on the Mitford sisters features prominently in Jo Walton's 2007 novel Ha'penny; Viola Lark, one of the point-of-view characters, is one of the sisters, another is married to Himmler, and a third is a communist spy.
- Sharon Horgan, Samantha Spiro and Sophie Ellis-Bextor played a version of the Mitford Sisters (Horgan as Unity, Spiro as Jessica and Ellis-Bextor as Nancy respectively) in a song-based sketch for season 2 of the Sky Arts comedy series Psychobitches, in the winter of 2014.
- In his French-language trilogy of novels—Le Vent du soir (1985), Tous les hommes en sont fous (1985) and Le Bonheur à San Miniato (1987)—Jean d'Ormesson recounts a much-imagined version of the exploits of four of the Mitford sisters, through the characters Pandora, Vanessa, Atalanta and Jessica.
- A portion of Jessica Mitford's writing is used as a spoken-word introduction to the song "Last Act of Defiance", about the New Mexico State Penitentiary riot, on thrash metal band Exodus's 1989 album Fabulous Disaster.
- Jessica Fellowes has written six mystery novels, The Mitford Murders (2017), Bright Young Dead (2018), The Mitford Scandal (2020),The Mitford Trial (2021), The Mitford Vanishing (2022) and The Mitford Secret (2023), which feature the three oldest sisters, Nancy, Pamela and Diana as major characters, and the rest of the family in supporting roles.
- Diana Mitford is depicted in season 6 of the BBC/Netflix TV series Peaky Blinders (2022), played by British actress Amber Anderson. The show is set in the 1930s and depicts Diana and husband Oswald Mosley getting involved with fictional protagonist Tommy Shelby to advance their political goals.
- In the Discworld novel The Fifth Elephant by Terry Pratchett, werewolf Watchwoman Angua von Überwald refers to two relatives of hers as Nancy and Unity. Angua's brother Wolfgang is a werewolf supremacist whose personal insignia reflect those of Nazism.
- In the fourth series of the BBC comedy television series The Thick of It, British Government minister Peter Mannion describes his special adviser Emma Messinger as having "turned into the wrong Mitford sister" during a presentation where she remarks on the physical attractiveness of Dan Miller, a likely candidate for Leader of the Opposition.
- Outrageous is a 2025 British television series about the Mitford sisters.

== Gallery ==
The Mitford sisters by William Acton:

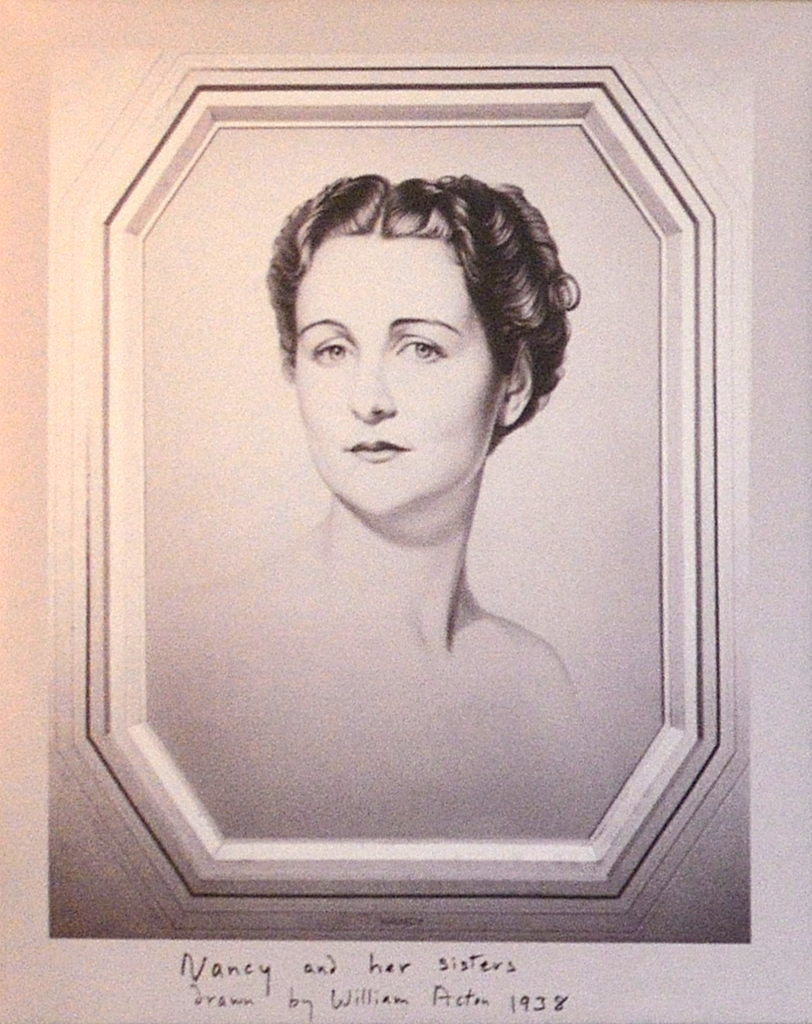
Nancy Mitford (1904–1973)

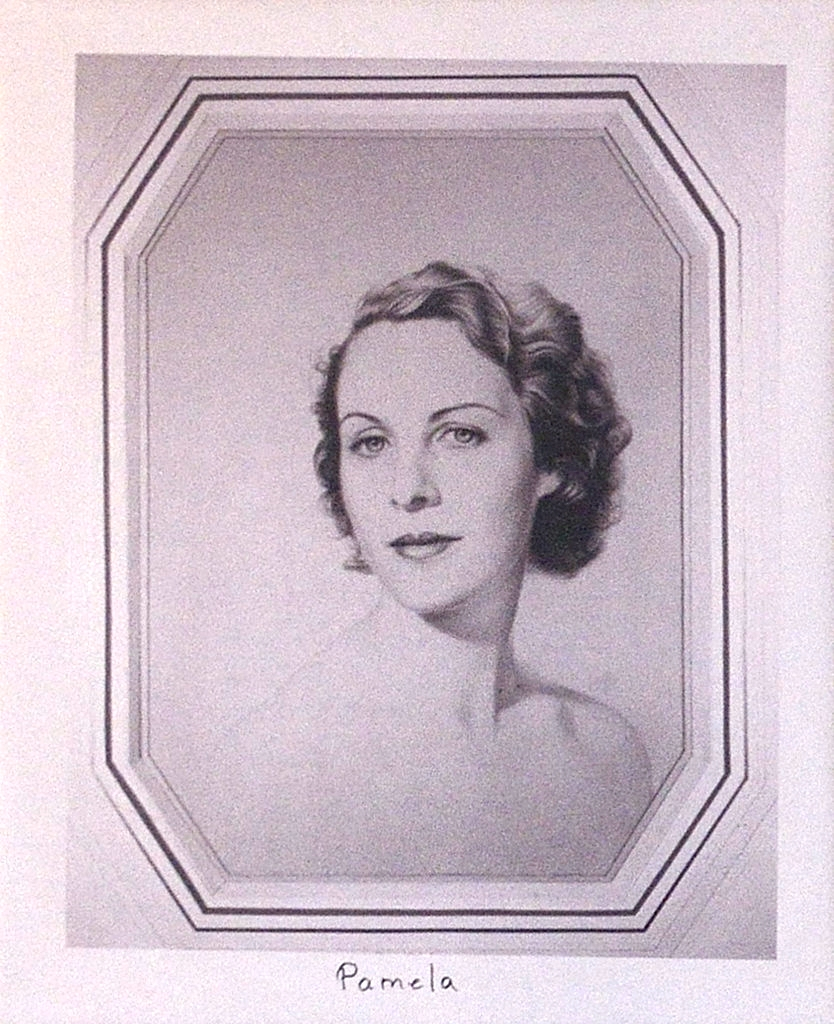
Pamela Mitford (1907–1994)

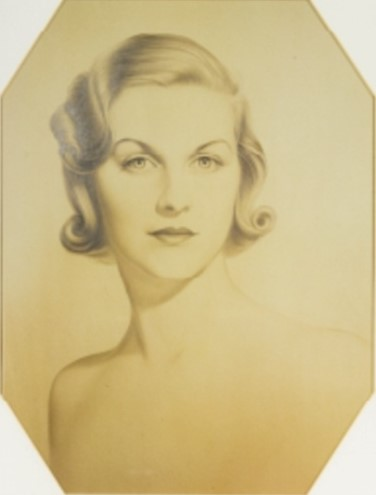
Diana Mitford (1910–2003)

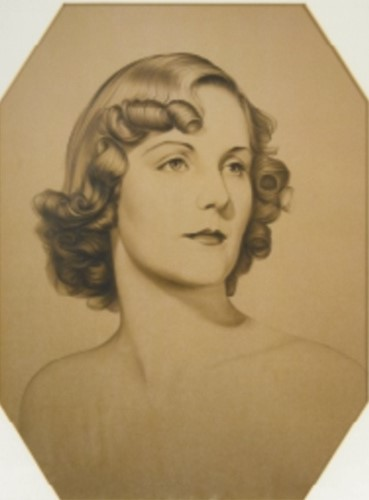
Unity Mitford (1914–1948)

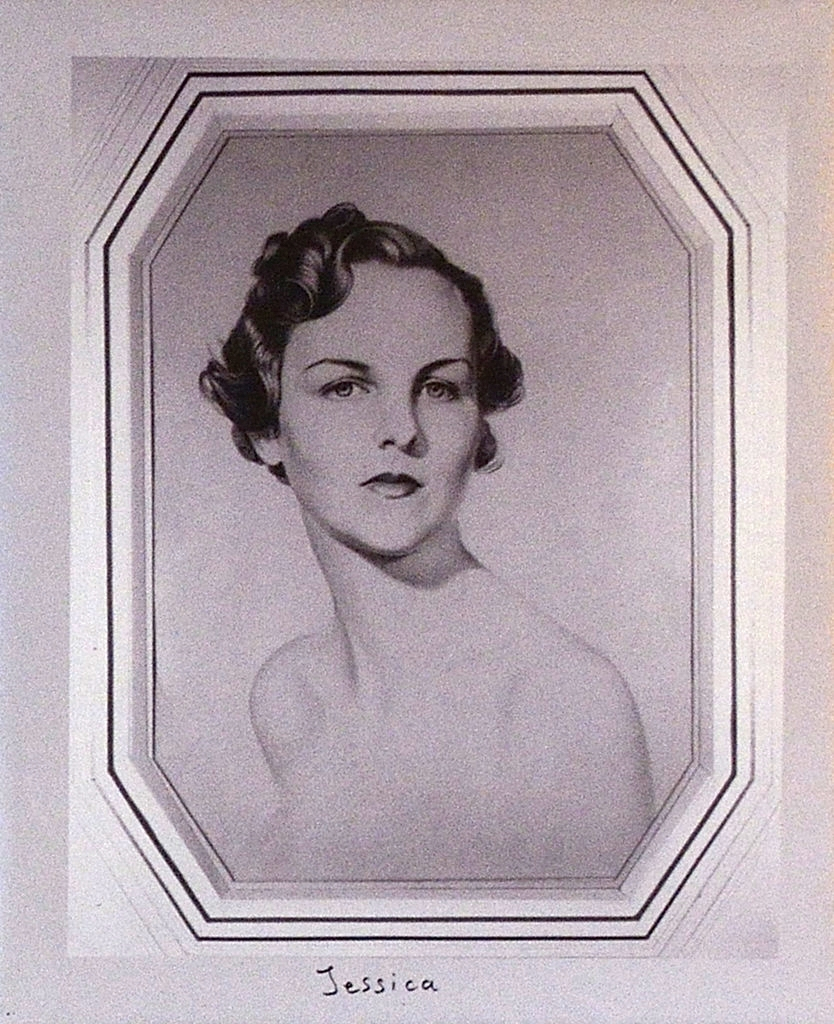
Jessica Mitford (1917–1996)

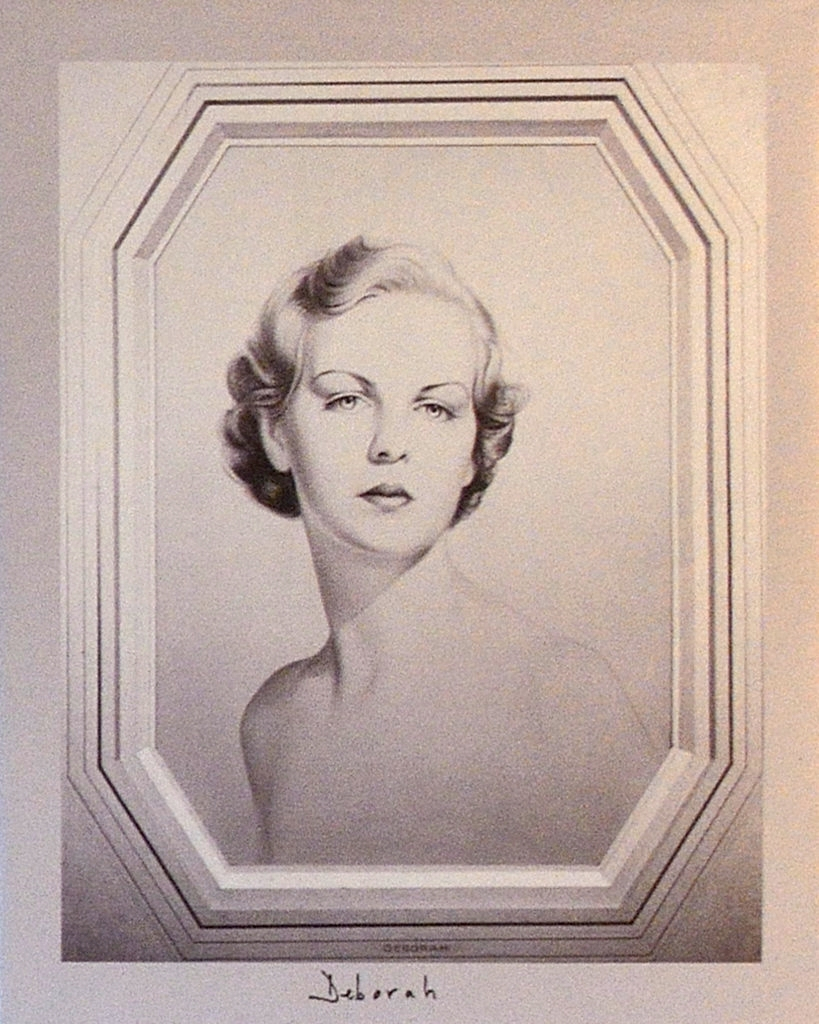
Deborah Mitford (1920–2014)
