= The Mitford Years =

Novel by Jan Karon

The Mitford Years is a series of fifteen novels by American writer Jan Karon, set in the fictional town of Mitford, North Carolina. The novels are Christian-themed, and center on the life of the rector, Father Tim Kavanagh.

== Novels ==
- At Home in Mitford (1994)
- A Light in the Window (1995)
- These High, Green Hills (1996)
- Out to Canaan (1997)
- A New Song (1999)
- A Common Life: The Wedding Story (2001)
- In This Mountain (2002)
- Shepherds Abiding (2003)
- Light from Heaven (2005)
- Home to Holly Springs (2007)
- In the Company of Others (2010)
- Somewhere Safe with Somebody Good (2014)
- Come Rain or Come Shine (2015)
- To Be Where You Are (2017)
- My Beloved (2025)
