= A Light in the Window (novel) =

1995 novel by Jan Karon

- 1998 Hardcover copy
- Author: Jan Karon
- Cover artist: George Ulrich
- Language: English
- Series: The Mitford Years
- Genre: Novel
- Publisher: Lion Publishing
- Publication date: 1995
- Publication place: United States
- Media type: Print (Hardcover, Paperback)
- ISBN: 0-7459-2803-X
- OCLC: 32648267
- Preceded by: At Home in Mitford
- Followed by: These High, Green Hills

A Light in the Window is a novel written by American author Jan Karon. It is book two of The Mitford Years series. The first edition (ISBN 0-7459-2803-X) was published in hardcover format by Doubleday in 1994.

== List of characters ==
- Father Tim
- Cynthia Coppersmith
- Edith Mallory
- Dooley Barlowe
