= Castle Island, England =

Eyot in Northumberland, England

Castle Island
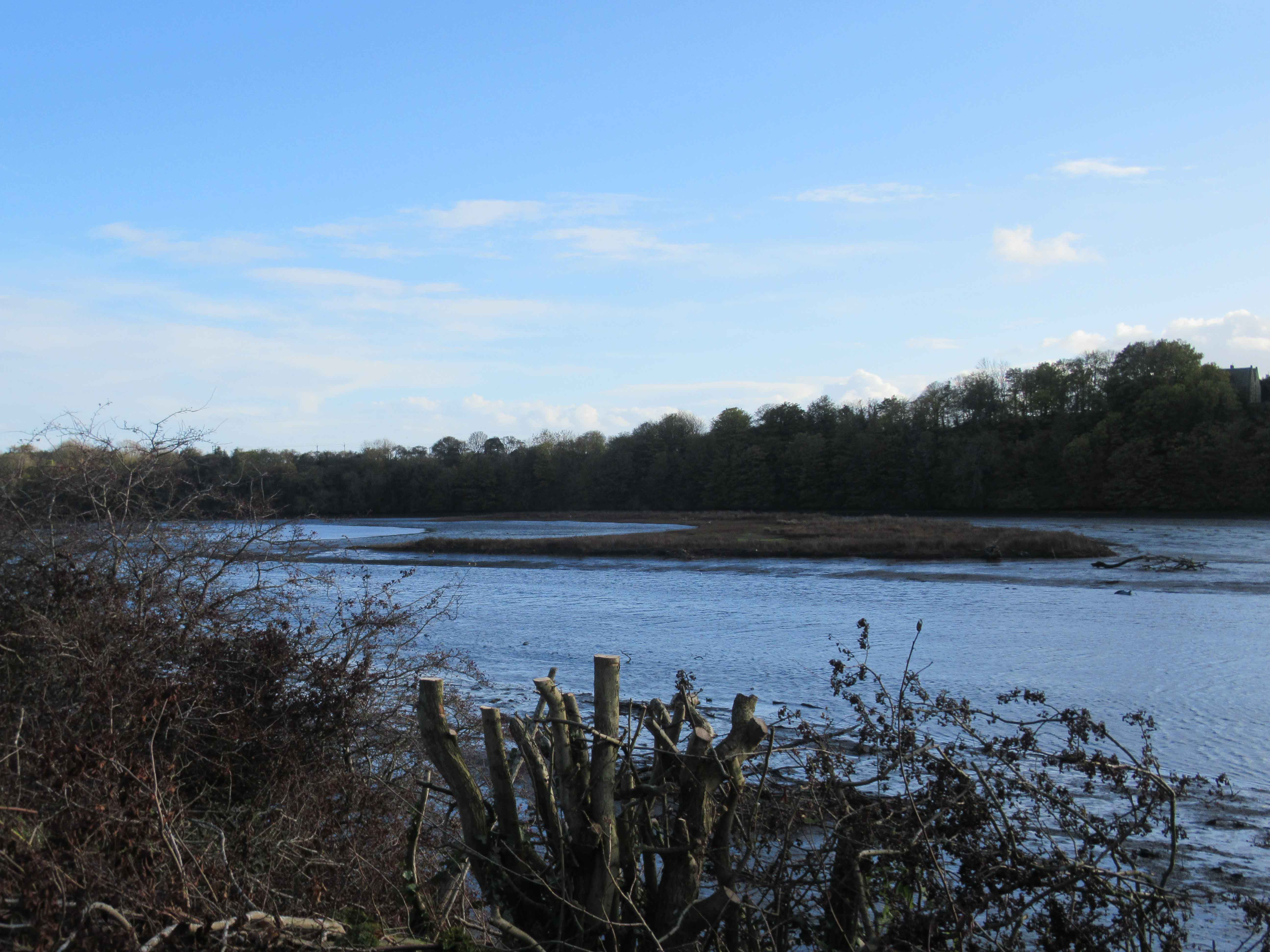
- Image of Castle Island by Les Hull
- Interactive map of Castle Island

Geography
- Location: River Wansbeck
- Type: Ait
- Area: 2.25 acres (0.91 ha)

Administration
- England
- County: Northumberland

Demographics
- Population: 0

Castle Island is an island (ait) located within the River Wansbeck in Ashington, Northumberland.

Castle Island was historically part of the Ashington and North Seaton parishes. The island used to be much larger.

Since 2003, Castle Island has been a Local Nature Reserve. The island is home various bird species, such as Sandpiper, Greenshank, and Little Stint.
