= Castle Island, New Zealand =

Uninhabited island of New Zealand

Castle Island
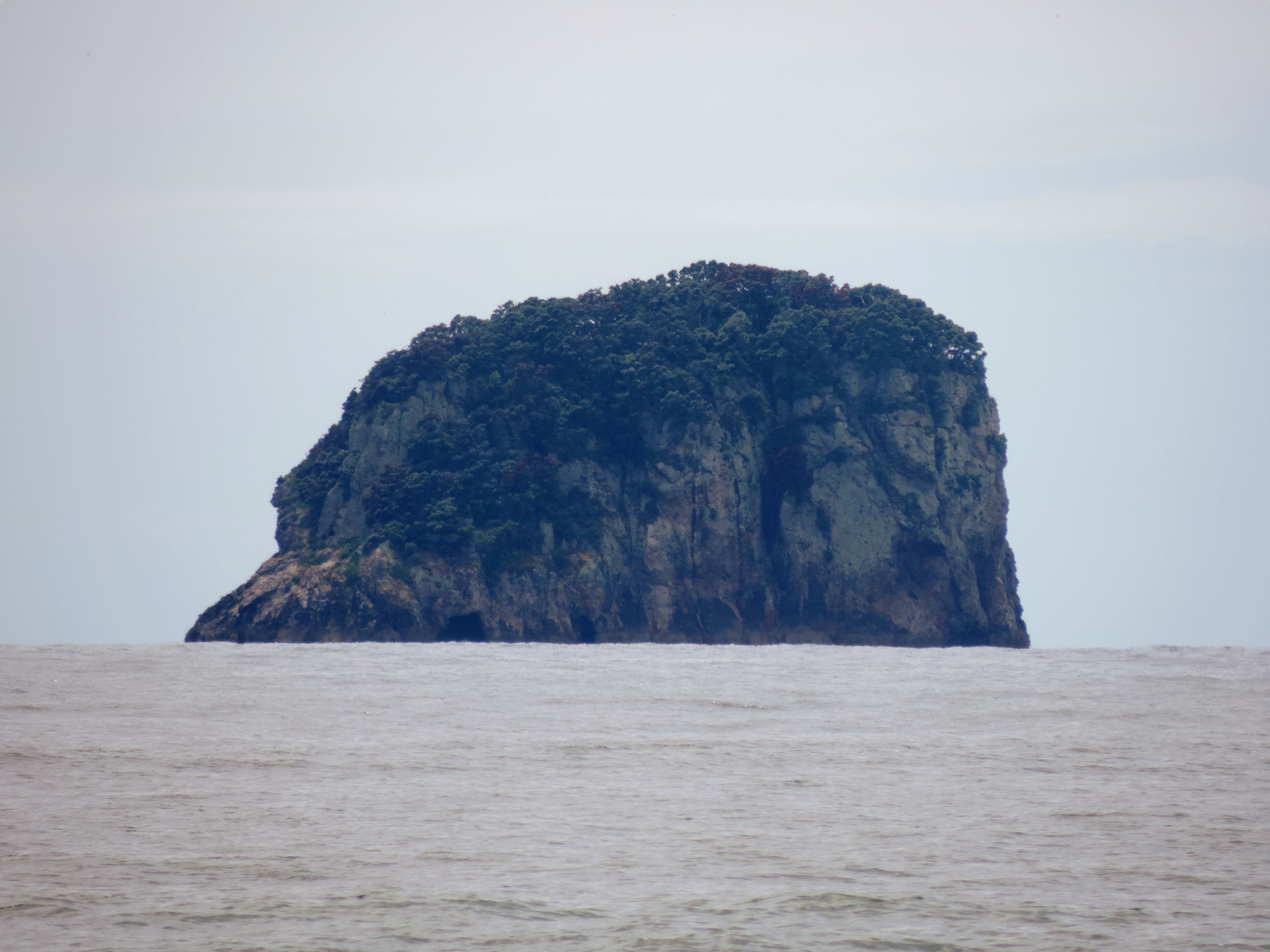
- Castle Island as seen from Hot Water Beach

- Location within North Island

Geography
- Location: Coromandel Peninsula
- Coordinates: 36°52′8″S 175°53′23″E
- Area: 0.02 km^{2} (0.0077 sq mi)
- Length: 0.2 km (0.12 mi)
- Width: 0.1 km (0.06 mi)
- Highest elevation: 59 m (194 ft)
- Highest point: Ponui

Administration
- New Zealand

Demographics
- Population: 0

Castle Island is a small uninhabited island 6 kilometres (3.7 mi) off the coast of Hot Water Beach on the Coromandel Peninsula, New Zealand.
