= Mitford Hall =

Coordinates: 55°09′48″N 1°44′34″W

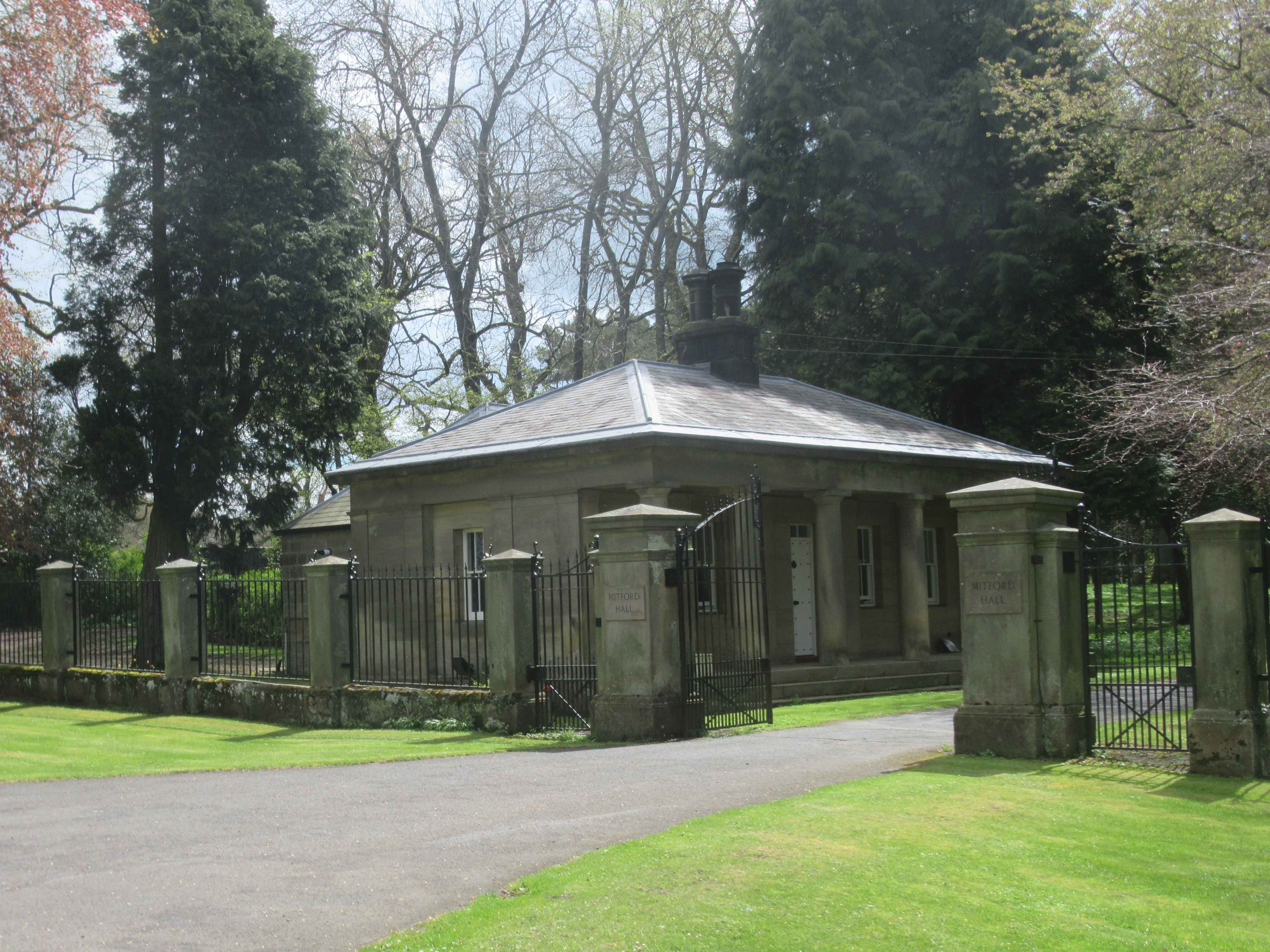
- Lodge and gates to Mitford Hall

- Location within Northumberland
- Location: Northumberland, England

History
- Built: 1828

Listed Building – Grade II
- Designated: 6 May 1952
- Reference no.: 1042650

Mitford Hall is a Georgian mansion house and Grade II* listed building standing in its own 85-acre (34 ha) park overlooking the River Wansbeck at Mitford, Northumberland.

It was built in 1828 by the Mitford family to a design by architect John Dobson, to replace their old home, Mitford Old Manor House, on the opposite side of the river.

Since 1993 it has been owned by Shepherd Offshore, the Shepherd family business run by Bruce and the late Freddy Shepherd.
