= William Kenyon Mitford =

British Army officer, landowner and courtier

Colonel William Kenyon Mitford, CMG, CVO, DL, JP (1857–1943) was a British Army officer, landowner and courtier.

== Career ==
Mitford was the son of William Townley Mitford (1817–1889), a Conservative Member of Parliament (MP) from Sussex, by his wife Hon. Margaret Emma Kenyon (1836–1927), daughter of the 3rd Baron Kenyon. The Mitford family of Pitshill in Tillington was descended from the Mitfords of Mitford in Northumberland whose lineage begins with Sir John Mitford who died in 1409. William Mitford (1699-1777) came to Sussex and started the Pitshill branch.

Mitford was commissioned in the 8th Hussars in 1876, served in the Second Anglo-Afghan War 1879–1880, and was a captain in the regiment from 1884 until 1891, when he resigned from the regular army. He was appointed a lieutenant-colonel in command of the Middlesex Yeomanry on 23 April 1892, serving as such until 1903. Following the outbreak of the Second Boer War in late 1899 he volunteered for active service, and was commissioned a lieutenant-colonel in command of the 11th Battalion Imperial Yeomanry on 20 January 1900. He left Liverpool on the SS Cymric in March 1900 as senior officer on the ship, which took 1,200 officers and men and 450 horses to South Africa. He was appointed a Companion of the Order of St Michael and St George (CMG) for his service in the war. After his return to the United Kingdom, he was appointed one of His Majesty's Honourable Corps of Gentlemen-at-Arms on 1 December 1900, and served as such until 1940.

Mitford was a Justice of the peace (JP) and a Deputy Lieutenant of Sussex. He was colonel and Aide-de-camp for Yeomanry to King Edward VII from 1904 to 1910 and to King George V from 1910 until 1924.

== Family ==
Milford married, in 1886, Cicely Maud Slade (b.1864), daughter of Wyndham Slade (1826–1910), son of Sir John Slade, 1st Baronet, by his wife Cicely Neave, daughter of Sir Digby Neave, 3rd Baronet. They had two children:

- William Slade Mitford (1898–1966)
- Colonel Cecil Townley Mitford-Slade (1903–1986), who was Lord Lieutenant of Somerset
