= Jan Karon =

American novelist (born 1937)

- Born: Janice Meredith Wilson; March 14, 1937 (age 89); Lenoir, North Carolina, U.S.
- Occupation: Novelist
- Spouse(s): Robert Freeland; Bill Orth; Arthur Karon
- Children: 1
- Parent(s): Robert Wilson; Wanda Wilson
- Writing career
- Notable work: The Mitford Years

Jan Karon (born March 14, 1937) is an American novelist who writes for both adults and young readers. She is the author of the New York Times-bestselling Mitford novels, featuring Father Timothy Kavanagh, an Episcopal priest, and the fictional village of Mitford. Her most recent Mitford novel, My Beloved, was released in October 2025.

She has been designated a lay Canon for the Arts in the Episcopal Diocese of Quincy (Illinois) by Keith Ackerman, Episcopal Bishop of Quincy, and in May 2000 she was awarded the Degree, Doctor of Humane Letters honoris causa by Nashotah House, a theological seminary in Nashotah, Wisconsin. In 2015, she was awarded the Library of Virginia's Literary Lifetime Achievement Award.

== Early life ==
Jan Karon was born in the Blue Ridge foothills town of Lenoir, North Carolina as Janice Meredith Wilson. She was named after the novel Janice Meredith. Before she was 4, her parents split up and left her with her maternal grandparents on a farm a few miles away in Hudson, North Carolina.

She dropped out of school in ninth grade at age 14 and married Robert Freeland in South Carolina, where girls her age could do so legally. Freeland, who was five years older, worked at a Charlotte tire store, while Jan worked in a clothing store.

At age 15, she gave birth to her only child, Candace Freeland. Jan and Freeland's marriage was troubled. Freeland was left paralyzed by a gun accident during their first year of marriage. The young couple was not able to cope together and later divorced when Jan was 18.

== Career ==
Jan, age 18, was on her own with her daughter Candace. She took a receptionist job at an advertising agency, where she started writing advertising copy. In her early 20s, Jan married the chemist Bill Orth. Orth was active with her in theater and the Unitarian Church. By the late 1960s, Jan and Orth were divorced, and she married a third time, to Arthur Karon, a clothing salesman, and became Jan Karon. They moved to Berkeley, California, where they lived for three years.

In California, Karon practiced Judaism, but she did not convert from Christianity. She continued to write. When Karon's third marriage ended she returned to Charlotte and again worked in advertising. By 1985, Karon had moved to Raleigh and the McKinney & Silver advertising agency, where she had worked in the late 1970s. An advertising campaign which ran in National Geographic and other magazines, won the 1987 Kelly Award, the print advertising equivalent of the Academy Award. Karon and a collaborator split a $100,000 prize.

In 1988, Karon quit her job and moved to Blowing Rock, North Carolina. There, Karon began writing Father Tim stories for The Blowing Rocket newspaper. In 1994, Karon herself placed her work with a small religious publisher, which brought out a volume titled At Home in Mitford. Two more Mitford novels appeared. Sales remained modest until Viking Penguin, a mainstream publisher not known for Christian fiction, in 1996 brought out Karon's first three titles as paperbacks. By the late 1990s, Karon's books were New York Times bestsellers. They have sold over 25 million copies.

In 2021, Karon founded The Mitford Museum in her former elementary school in Hudson, North Carolina.

== Personal life ==
In 2000, Karon left Blowing Rock and moved to Albemarle County, Virginia, where she restored a historic 1816 home and 100-acre (0.40 km^{2}) farm, Esmont Farm.

== Works ==
=== The Mitford Years ===
- At Home in Mitford (1994)
- A Light in the Window (1995)
- These High, Green Hills (1996)
- Out to Canaan (1997)
- A New Song (1999)
- A Common Life: The Wedding Story (2001)
- In This Mountain (2002)
- Shepherds Abiding (2003)
- Light from Heaven (2005)
- Home to Holly Springs (2007)
- In the Company of Others (2010)
- Somewhere Safe with Somebody Good (2014)
- Come Rain or Come Shine (2015)
- To Be Where You Are (2017)
- My Beloved (2025)

=== Mitford companion books ===
- Patches of Godlight: Father Tim's Favorite Quotes (2001)
- The Mitford Snowmen (2001)
- Esther's Gift: A Mitford Christmas Story (2002)
- Jan Karon's Mitford Cookbook and Kitchen Reader (2004)
- A Continual Feast: Words of Comfort and Celebration, collected by Father Tim (2005)
- The Mitford Bedside Companion (2006)
- Bathed in Prayer: Father Tim's Prayers, Sermons, and Reflections from the Mitford Series (2018)

=== Children's books ===
- Miss Fannie's Hat (1998)
- Jeremy: The Tale of an Honest Bunny (2000)
- Jan Karon Presents: Violet Comes to Stay (2006)
- Jan Karon Presents: Violet Goes to the Country (2007)

=== Other books ===
- The Trellis and the Seed: A Book of Encouragement for All Ages (2003)

=== Short works ===
"The Day Aunt Maude Left" in Response 1.4 (1961)

== Archive ==
Jan Karon's papers are held at the Albert and Shirley Small Special Collections Library at the University of Virginia. The papers include preparatory materials for all of Karon's books, personal correspondence and papers, extensive papers related to her historical restoration of Esmont Farm, and correspondence with readers.
