= Mitford, Northumberland =

Village in Northumberland, England

Coordinates: 55.168°N 1.726°W

Mitford
- Location within Northumberland
- Population: 448 (2011 census)
- OS grid reference: NZ175860
- Unitary authority: Northumberland
- Ceremonial county: Northumberland
- Region: North East
- Country: England
- Sovereign state: United Kingdom
- Post town: MORPETH
- Postcode district: NE61
- Police: Northumbria
- Fire: Northumberland
- Ambulance: North East
- UK Parliament: Hexham

Mitford is a village in Northumberland, England, located two miles (three kilometres) west of Morpeth.

== History ==
Although the foundation of Mitford is unknown, it was a barony during the Anglo-Saxon era. At the time of the Norman Conquest, the lord of the manor was John, labelled John de Mitford. He died in 1070 leaving a daughter, Sybilla, as his sole heir. William the Conqueror gave the heiress as bride to one of his knights, Sir Richard Bertram, who thus acquired the barony. At that time the territory stretched from Chopwell south of the River Tyne to an area in the Coquet Valley west of Rothbury.

Around 1110 Mitford was granted a Market Charter, one of the first granted north of the River Tyne. It was earlier a far greater market place for local people than the market at Morpeth to the east, which did not receive a charter until 1199. Morpeth's market soon grew in prominence and Mitford fell from grace. This historic status of the two market town led to a folk rhyme:

Mitforde was Mitforde when Morpeth was none,
and Mitforde shall be Mitforde when Morpeth is gone.

== Governance ==
The village lies within the Longhorsley Division of Northumberland County Council, represented since May 2013 by Cllr Glen Sanderson (Conservative) (2008–13 by Cllr David Towns, also Conservative) and the Wansbeck parliamentary constituency (Ian Lavery MP, Labour). The Boundary Commission unveiled proposals to transfer the village into the Hexham parliamentary constituency but the plans were abandoned when the reorganisation of constituency boundaries was halted by the government.

== Landmarks ==
Mitford Castle was built in timber in the 11th century by William Bertram, and his son Roger was given permission to rebuild in stone in 1166. By 1323 it was “entirely destroyed and burnt”. Today it is in ruins, and has recently undergone a major programme of structural support works.

== Religious sites ==
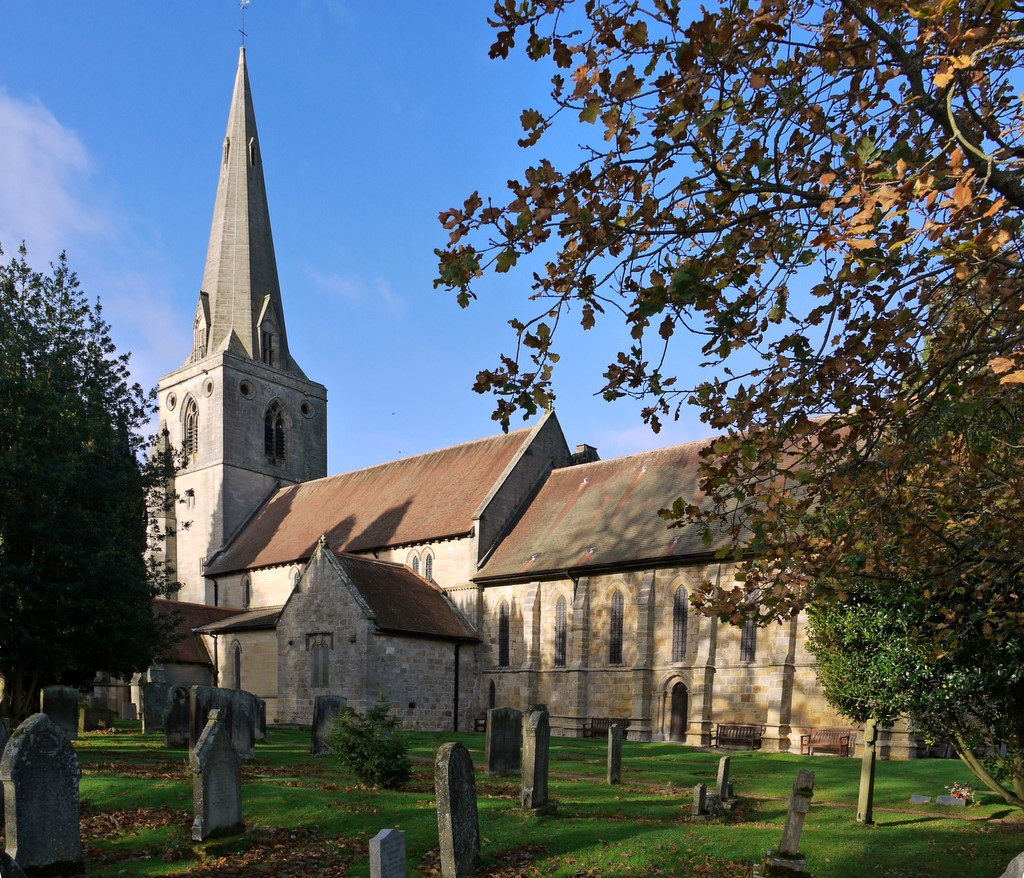
Church of St Mary Magdalene

The ancient church of St Mary Magdalene was rebuilt in 1875, but has preserved its Norman south arcade and 13th-century chancel. The church is believed to have the oldest bell in the Diocese of Newcastle, cast no later than about 1150.

== Fiction ==
In Light from Heaven, the last instalment of American author Jan Karon's contemporary Christian "Mitford Years" novel series (which is set in a fictional town in western North Carolina bearing the same name), the series' setting and the Mitford of this article become "sister villages."

Mitford was also a minor introductory character in The Magus by John Fowles.

== Notable people ==
The Mitford family held the Manor from Norman times. The ruins of their Manor House stand on the eastern side of the River Wansbeck. In about 1823 they abandoned the old Manor House for a new mansion house, Mitford Hall, which was designed by the famous Northern architect, John Dobson, and which was built on the opposite bank of the river and surrounded by woodland and a small deer park. The engraver James Thomson (1788–1850) was born in the village.

Mitford Hall is now owned by the Shepherd family.

== See also ==
- Mitford Castle
- Mitford Old Manor House
