= River Wansbeck =

River in Northumberland, England

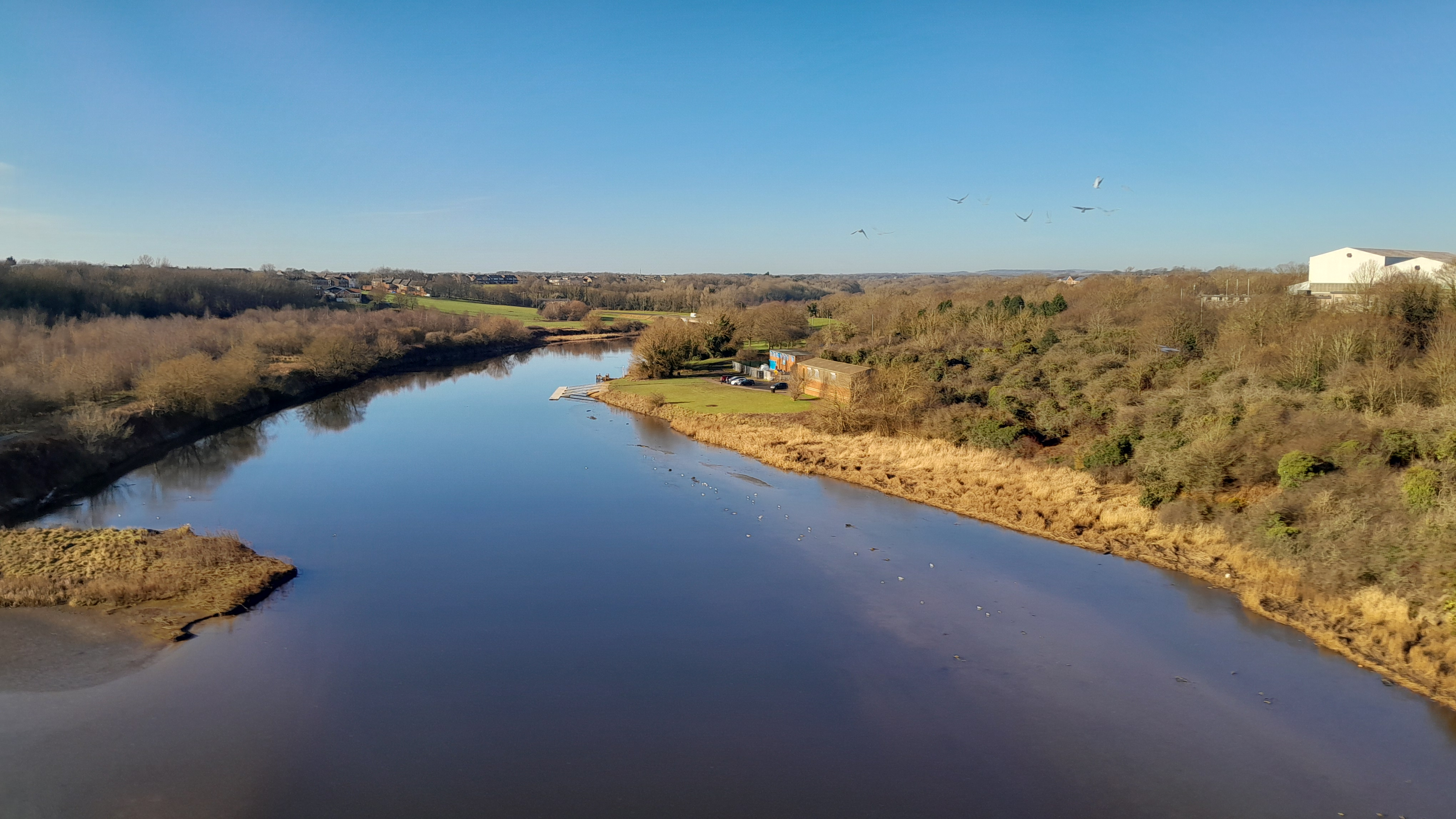
- The River Wansbeck near Ashington

- Location of mouth within Northumberland

Location
- Country: United Kingdom
- County: Northumberland

Physical characteristics
- Source
  - location: West of Sweethope Loughs
  - coordinates: 55.1409°N 2.137°W
  - elevation: 295 m (968 ft)
- Mouth
  - location: North Sea
  - coordinates: 55.1619°N 1.5294°W
- Length: 50 km (31 mi)

Basin features
- Tributaries
  - right: River Font, Hart Burn

The River Wansbeck runs through the county of Northumberland, England. It rises above Sweethope Lough on the edge of Fourlaws Forest in the area known locally as The Wanneys (Great Wanney Crag, Little Wanney Crag; thus the "Wanneys Beck"); runs through the town of Ashington before discharging into the North Sea at Sandy Bay near Newbiggin-by-the-Sea.

The River flows through the village of Kirkwhelpington, Hartburn, where the tributary Hart Burn joins, the village of Mitford, where the River Font joins, and the town of Morpeth.

The River Wansbeck is nicknamed the River Wanney. The term 'The Wilds of Wanney' is used by people of Tyneside to refer to the rural areas of Northumberland where the Wansbeck rises.

The River lent its name to the former Wansbeck district which was based in Ashington, and included Newbiggin-by-the-Sea, Bedlington and Stakeford.

Castle Island is an ait of the River Wansbeck.

== Barrage and navigation ==
Between 1974 and 75, a £250,000 barrage with a navigation lock was built near the rivermouth and adjacent to the A189 road bridge. In so doing the lower three miles of river became a country park and are recognised as England's most northerly inland (locked) navigation. Very little use of the lock has actually been recorded, although rowing and sailing craft are launched and used in the country park.

Stakeford Bridge is about midway in the navigable part. Sheepwash Bridge is near the upper limit of the park and the navigable water.

From 1985, the new navigation was officially recorded in The Inland Waterways of Great Britain, noting that the navigation authority was then Wansbeck District Council, which means that, since 2009, Northumberland County has held that role.

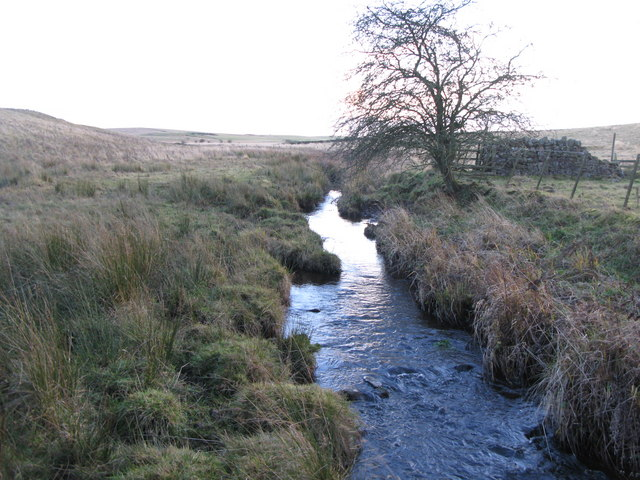
The infant River Wansbeck as a stream

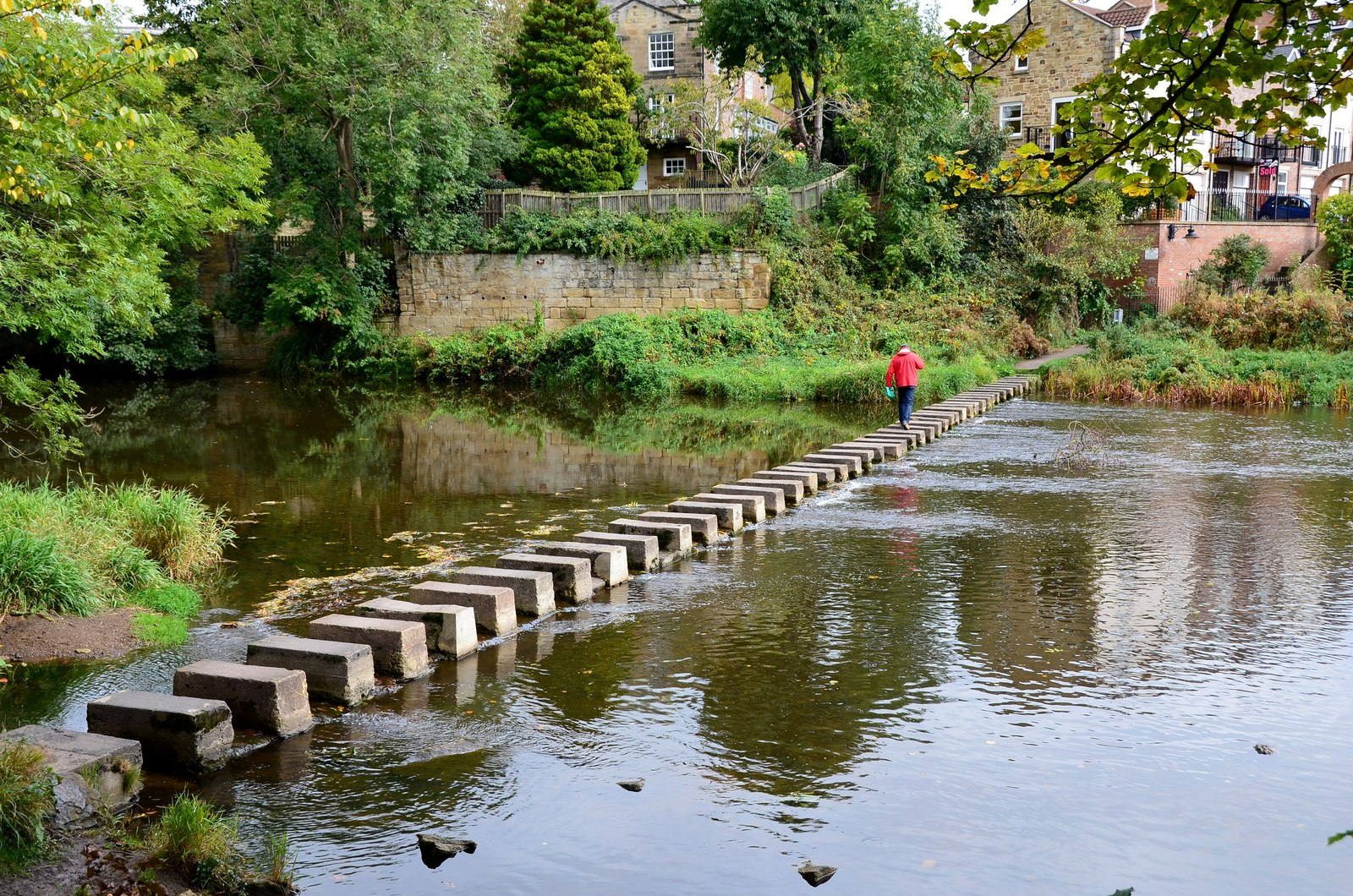
Stepping stones at Morpeth

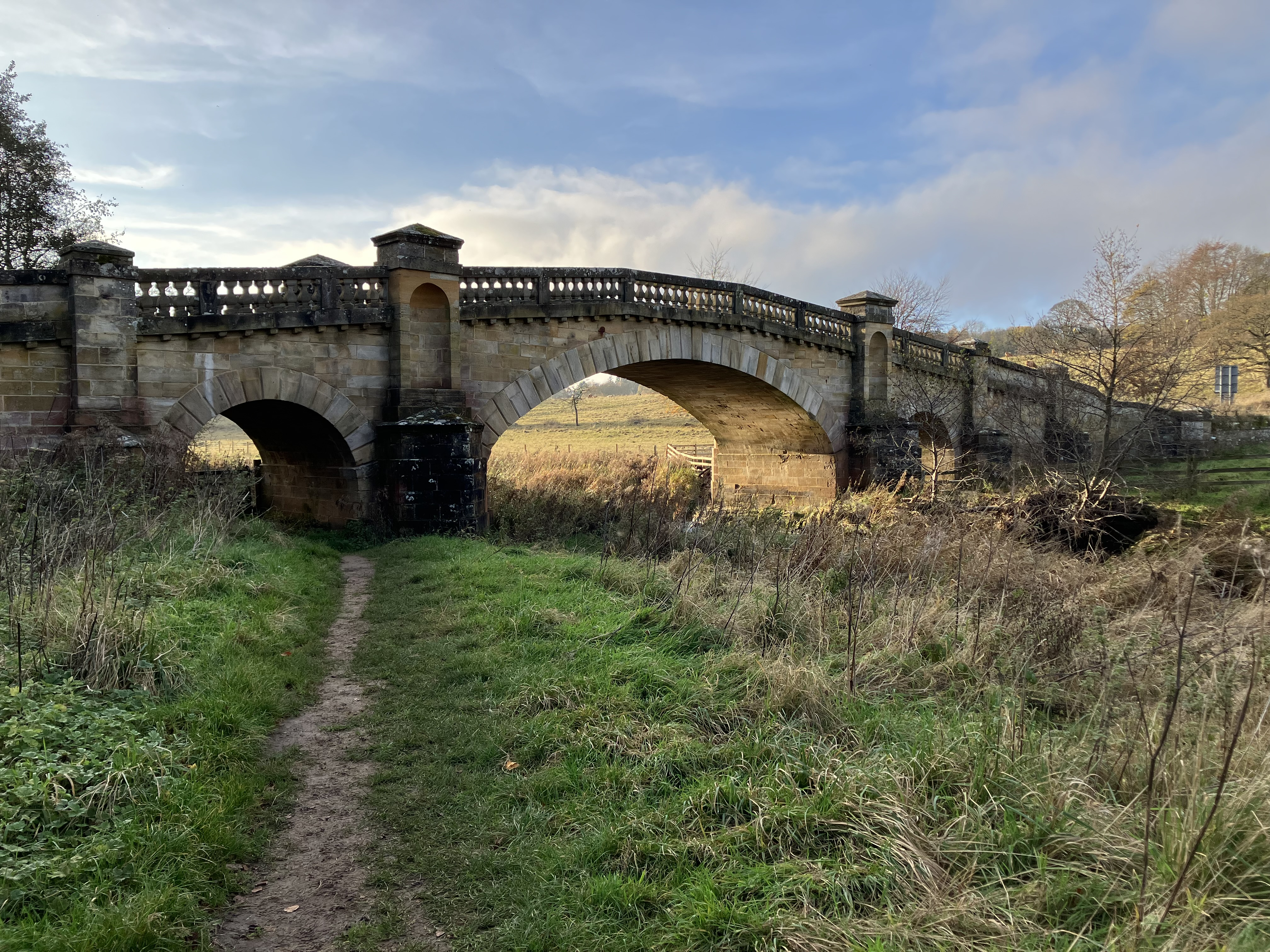
Wallington Bridge between Kirkharle and Cambo

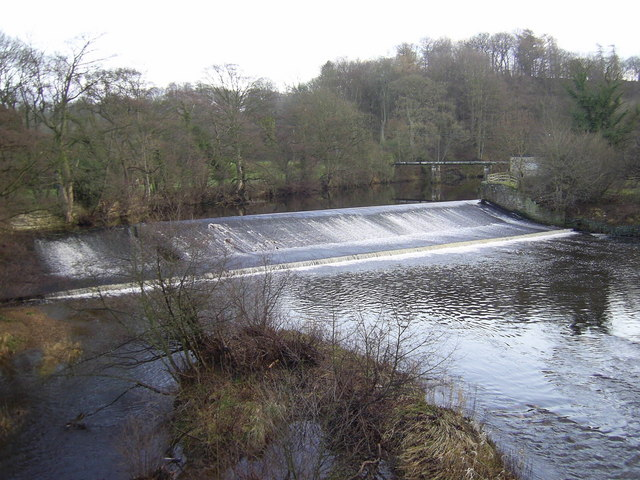
Weir at Mitford

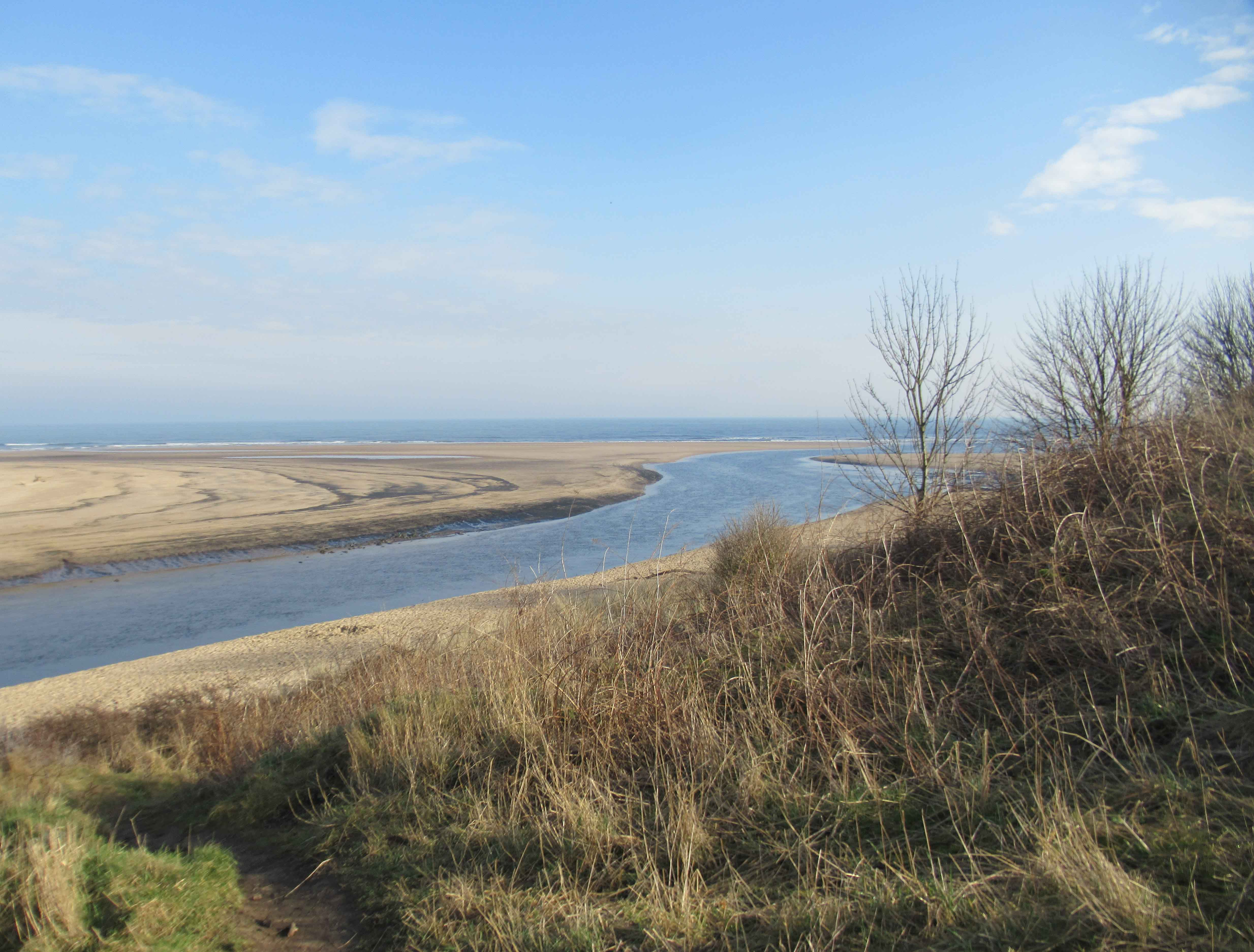
River Wansbeck meets the North Sea

== Road and rail river crossings ==
- North Seaton A189 Bridge, A189 (road, foot)
- North Seaton Railway Bridge (rail), used to carry Blyth and Tyne Railway now used for freight
- Stakeford Bridge, A196 (road, foot)
- Sheepwash Bridge, A1068 road (road, foot)
- Bothal Mill Bridge, A196 (road, foot)
- Pegswood Railway Viaduct, East Coast Main Line (rail)
- Morpeth Telford Bridge, A197 (road, foot)
- Lowford Bridge, B6343 (road, foot)
- Highford Bridge, B6343 (road, foot)
- A1 Bridge (road)
- Mitford Bridge, B6343 (road, foot)
- Meldon Bridge (road, foot)
- Mill House Bridge, B6343 (road, foot)
- Low Angerton Bridge (road, foot)
- Low Angerton Railway Bridge (disused), Used to carry the Wansbeck Railway
- Middleton Bridge, B6343 (road, foot)
- Wallington Bridge, B6342 (road, foot)
- Kirkwhelpington Bridge (road, foot)
- Kirkwhelpington A696 Bridge (road)
- Sweethope Loughs Road Bridge (road, foot)

== See also ==
- Rivers of the United Kingdom
