= Love in a Cold Climate (2001 TV series) =

British Serial Drama Miniseries

- Genre: Drama
- Based on: The Pursuit of Love and Love in a Cold Climate by Nancy Mitford
- Screenplay by: Deborah Moggach
- Directed by: Tom Hooper
- Starring: Alan Bates; Celia Imrie; Anthony Andrews; Rosamund Pike; Elisabeth Dermot Walsh; Megan Dodds
- Theme music composer: Rob Lane
- Country of origin: United Kingdom
- Original language: English
- No. of series: 1
- No. of episodes: 2

Production
- Producer: Kate Harwood
- Cinematography: Larry Smith
- Running time: 151 minutes

Original release
- Network: BBC1
- Release: 4 February – 11 February 2001

Love in a Cold Climate is a British two-part drama produced by the BBC in association with WGBH Boston, and first broadcast in two parts on BBC One on 4 and 11 February 2001. The series was adapted by Deborah Moggach from Nancy Mitford's novels The Pursuit of Love (1945) and Love in a Cold Climate (1949), and was directed by Tom Hooper.

It stars Rosamund Pike as Fanny, Elisabeth Dermot Walsh as Linda, Megan Dodds as Polly, Alan Bates as Uncle Matthew, and Celia Imrie as Aunt Sadie. The production staff researched the background to Mitford's novels by interviewing her surviving sister Deborah. The series was accompanied by an Omnibus profile of Mitford and a documentary series entitled The Mitford World on BBC Knowledge.

Love in a Cold Climate was nominated for two British Academy Television Awards; Bates was nominated for Best Actor, and the production team received nominations in the Costume Design and Production Design categories.

An earlier adaptation of Love in a Cold Climate was broadcast in eight episodes in 1980, starring Judi Dench, Michael Aldridge, and Vivian Pickles.

== Cast ==
- Rosamund Pike as Fanny
- Elisabeth Dermot Walsh as Linda
- Megan Dodds as Polly
- Alan Bates as Uncle Matthew
- Celia Imrie as Aunt Sadie
- Anthony Andrews as Boy
- John Wood as Lord Merlin
- Sheila Gish as Lady Montdore
- John Standing as Lord Montdore
- Jemima Rooper as Jassy
- John Light as Christian
- Samuel Labarthe as Fabrice
- Daniel Evans as Cedric Hampton
- Jane How as Veronica
- Frances Barber as The Bolter
- Anna Popplewell as Victoria
