= Count Your Blessings (1959 film) =

1959 film by Jean Negulesco

- Original film poster
- Directed by: Jean Negulesco
- Written by: Karl Tunberg
- Based on: The Blessing; 1951 novel by Nancy Mitford
- Produced by: Karl Tunberg
- Starring: Deborah Kerr; Rossano Brazzi; Maurice Chevalier
- Cinematography: George J. Folsey; Milton R. Krasner
- Edited by: Harold F. Kress
- Music by: Franz Waxman
- Distributed by: Metro-Goldwyn-Mayer
- Release date: April 23, 1959 (US)
- Running time: 102 minutes
- Country: United States
- Language: English
- Budget: $2,311,000
- Box office: $1,710,000

Count Your Blessings is a 1959 American romantic comedy drama film released by Metro-Goldwyn-Mayer. It was directed by Jean Negulesco, written and produced by Karl Tunberg, based on the 1951 novel The Blessing by Nancy Mitford. The music score was by Franz Waxman and the cinematography by George J. Folsey and Milton R. Krasner. The costume design was by Helen Rose.

The film stars Deborah Kerr, Rossano Brazzi and Maurice Chevalier.

The film was shot in London and Paris.

== Plot ==
While visiting Grace Allingham in wartime London at the behest of Hugh "Hughie" Palgrave, his friend, Charles is charmed by her and abruptly proposes marriage. They marry, but after three days into their honeymoon, Charles must report back for military duty.

He reportedly is shot and taken prisoner. Grace waits for his return while raising their young son, Sigismond "Sigi". Charles returns after nine years, but over time, Grace comes to learn that during his long absence he has been seeing other women. She turns for comfort to her old love, Hughie.

A divorce seems imminent, while eight year-old Sigi is torn between the two parents and their very different ways of life. Because of their commitment to him, Grace and Charles ultimately reconcile.

== Cast ==
- Deborah Kerr as Grace Allingham
- Rossano Brazzi as Charles Edouard de Valhubert
- Maurice Chevalier as Duc de St. Cloud
- Martin Stephens as Sigismond
- Tom Helmore as Hugh Palgrave
- Ronald Squire as Sir Conrad Allingham
- Patricia Medina as Albertine
- Mona Washbourne as Nanny
- Steven Geray as Guide
- Lumsden Hare as John
- Kim Parker as Secretary

== Box office ==
According to MGM records the film earned $810,000 in the US and Canada and $900,000 elsewhere resulting in a loss of $1,688,000.

== See also ==
- List of American films of 1959
