= Alan S. C. Ross =

Alan Strode Campbell Ross (1 February 1907 – 23 September 1980) was a British academic specialising in linguistics. He is best remembered as the ultimate source and inspiration for author Nancy Mitford's "U and non-U" forms of behaviour and language usage as class indicators.

== Lineage and early life ==
A patrilineal descendant of Robert the Bruce, he was the elder son of Archibald Campbell Carne Ross of Penzance and Brecon (through whom he descended also from Joseph Carne, of the Batten, Carne and Carne bank), and Millicent Strode Cobham. His paternal grandfather was Charles Campbell Ross. He was educated at Lindisfarne in Blackheath, Naish House in Burnham-on-Sea, Malvern College and Christ College, Brecon. He also attended Balliol College, University of Oxford, after winning a Henry Skynner Scholarship in Astronomy in 1925; however, he transferred to the School of English Language and Literature and graduated B.A. with first class honours in 1929. He also possessed a master's degree from the University of Birmingham.

== Career ==
He was appointed an Assistant Lecturer in English Language at the University of Leeds in 1929, becoming a full lecturer in 1936. In 1930, he was a founder member of the Yorkshire Society for Celtic Studies, sitting on its executive committee from 1933 to at least 1939. During the Second World War from 1940 he worked for the Foreign Office, but remained on the books at Leeds, before returning to academic life in 1946, at first to his Leeds job, but in the same year becoming a Lecturer in English Language at Birmingham University.. He became Reader the following year. He was Professor of English Language at Birmingham from 1948 to 1951 and Professor of Linguistics 1951–74.

In an article published in 1954, he coined the terms "U" and "non-U", on the differences that social class makes in English language usage.

== Personal life ==
On 11 July 1933, Ross married Elizabeth Stefanyja Olszewska (12 May 1906 – 20 April 1973), daughter of a Warsaw-based Polish father, Maciej Bronislaw Wacław Olszewski, and English mother, Ada Ethel Briggs. Olszewska was noted for her textual editing and as co-translator of The Life of Gudmund the Good, Bishop of Hólar. The couple had one son, Alan Wacław Padmint Ross (born 1934); the marriage ended with her death in 1973. Their grandsons include the diplomat and author Carne Ross.

== Bibliography ==
- The Dream of the Rood (with B. Dickins), 1934;
- Studies in the Accidence of the Lindisfarne Gospels, 1937;
- The Numeral-Signs of the Mohenjo-daro Script, 1938;
- The Terfinnas and Beormas of Ohthere, 1940;
- Ginger, 1952;
- Noblesse Oblige: An Enquiry into the Identifiable Characteristics of the English Aristocracy, 1956; - co-authored with Nancy Mitford, Evelyn Waugh, Peter Fleming (as 'Strix'), Christopher Sykes and John Betjeman. Illustrated by Osbert Lancaster.
- Urs Graf edn of the Lindisfarne Gospels (with others), 1956–1960;
- Etymology, 1958;
- Essentials of German Grammar, 1963;
- (with F. G. Healey) Patience Napoléon, 1963;
- (with A. W. Moverley) The Pitcairnese Language, 1964;
- Essentials of English Grammar, 1964;
- (with N. F. C. Owen) I. I. Revizin, Models of Language (translated from Russian), 1966;
- Arts v. Science (ed), 1967;
- (ed) What are U, 1969;
- (ed jtly) The Durham Ritual, 1969;
- How to Pronounce It, 1970; ISBN 978-0241019672
- Don't Say It, 1973; ISBN 978-0241024263
- articles in Acta Philologica Scandinavica, Archivum Linguisticum, Biometrika, Englische Studien, Finnisch-ugrische Forschungen, Indogermanische Forschungen, Geographical Journal, Journal English and Germanic Philology, Journal Roy. Statistical Soc., Mathematical Gazette, Moderna Sprak, Mod. Language Notes, Modern Language Review, Nature, Neuphilologische Mitteilungen, Studia germanica, Zeitschrift für vergleichende Sprachforschung, Saga-Book of Viking Society, Trans of Philological Soc., etc.; contrib: Noblesse Oblige (ed N. Mitford); U and non-U Revisited (ed R. Buckle);
- co-editor, Leeds Studies in English and Kindred Languages, 1 (1932), 2 (1933), 3 (1934), 4 (1935), 5 (1936), 6 (1937);
- Editor, English Philological Studies VIII-XIV.

== See also ==
- U and non-U English
