= Yolande Palfrey =

British actress

- Born: Yolande Anne Elissa Palfrey; 29 March 1957; England
- Died: 9 April 2011 (aged 54); Esher, England
- Occupation: Actress
- Years active: 1976–1991

Yolande Anne Elissa Palfrey (29 March 1957 – 9 April 2011) was a British actress.

She appeared in many BBC programmes including Pennies from Heaven, Measure for Measure, Elizabeth Alone, Wings, Blake's 7 ("Pressure Point"), Crime and Punishment, Nanny, and Doctor Who (in the serial The Trial of a Time Lord), as well as The Ghosts of Motley Hall for Granada Television in the Christmas special "Phantomime" (1977).

She also appeared in (among others) The Finishing Line, Love in a Cold Climate for Thames Television, Dragonslayer for The Walt Disney Company and Paramount Pictures, and The Breadwinner for Yorkshire Television.

Her stage performances included Murder, Dear Watson at The Mill at Sonning and Great Expectations at the Old Vic.

Palfrey died from a brain tumour on 9 April 2011, aged 54.
