= The Blessing (novel) =

1951 novel by Nancy Mitford

- First edition
- Author: Nancy Mitford
- Language: English
- Publisher: Random House
- Publication date: 1951
- Publication place: United Kingdom
- Media type: Print (hardcover)
- Pages: 305

The Blessing is a novel by Nancy Mitford, first published in 1951. A comic satire of postwar Anglo-French society, it concerns the marriage of an inexperienced Englishwoman to a charming but unfaithful French aristocrat, and the schemes of their young son to prevent his parents from reconciling. The novel explores themes of cultural misunderstanding, infidelity, class, and the contrasting manners of English and French upper-class life.

Although separate from Mitford's earlier Radlett novels, The Blessing contains references to characters from The Pursuit of Love and anticipates themes later revisited in Don't Tell Alfred.

== Plot summary ==
The novel begins shortly after the Second World War. Grace Allingham, a naïve and sheltered Englishwoman from the countryside, marries the glamorous French aristocrat Charles-Edouard de Valhubert after a wartime romance. Soon after their marriage, Charles-Edouard returns to France, while Grace remains in England with their infant son, Sigismond ("Sigi"), because of postwar travel restrictions and economic difficulties.

Several years later, Grace and Sigi are finally reunited with Charles-Edouard in Paris. Grace finds herself bewildered by French high society, whose conventions differ sharply from her English upbringing. Charles-Edouard moves effortlessly through a world of fashionable parties, extramarital affairs, and aristocratic gossip, while Grace struggles to adapt to French expectations regarding appearance, sophistication, and marriage.

Grace gradually discovers that her husband is serially unfaithful and views flirtation and infidelity as natural aspects of married life. Deeply unhappy, she repeatedly contemplates leaving him, but remains emotionally attached to him despite his behaviour.

Sigi, meanwhile, develops an intense attachment to his mother and a growing hostility towards his father. Intelligent and manipulative beyond his years, he devises elaborate schemes to keep his parents apart whenever they appear close to reconciliation. By intercepting letters, creating misunderstandings, and exploiting the emotional weaknesses of both parents, Sigi becomes a disruptive force within the marriage.

The novel follows the increasingly strained relationship between Grace and Charles-Edouard as Grace attempts to navigate Parisian society and understand the moral codes of her adopted country. While Charles-Edouard remains charming and affectionate, he proves incapable of fidelity or emotional seriousness. Grace alternates between indignation and resignation, gradually losing many of her English assumptions about marriage and respectability.

By the end of the novel, the marriage survives in an ambiguous and unstable form. Sigi's interventions continue to undermine any lasting reconciliation, while Grace acquires a more cynical understanding of both love and French society.

== Main characters ==
- Grace Allingham de Valhubert – an innocent Englishwoman who marries Charles-Edouard and struggles to adapt to Parisian aristocratic society.
- Charles-Edouard de Valhubert – Grace's charming, handsome, and persistently unfaithful French husband.
- Sigismond "Sigi" de Valhubert – the son of Grace and Charles-Edouard, whose possessiveness towards his mother leads him to manipulate both parents.
- Nanny – Sigi's outspoken English nanny, deeply suspicious of French customs and society.
- Louise de Valhubert – a relative of Charles-Edouard who helps introduce Grace to French aristocratic circles.
- Monsieur de Valhubert – Charles-Edouard's father, representative of traditional French aristocratic attitudes.

== Themes ==
Like many of Mitford's novels, The Blessing satirises upper-class social behaviour and the institution of marriage. However, unlike the largely English settings of The Pursuit of Love and Love in a Cold Climate, the novel focuses heavily on cultural differences between England and France. Grace's bewilderment at French attitudes towards adultery, child-rearing, and social etiquette forms much of the book's comedy.

The novel also examines postwar European society and the decline of traditional certainties after 1945. Parisian aristocratic life is depicted as glamorous but morally detached, contrasting with Grace's conventional English values. Sigi's manipulative behaviour introduces darker psychological elements beneath the comic surface.

Critics have noted that Charles-Edouard resembles the glamorous but unreliable Frenchmen admired by Mitford herself during her years living in Paris. The novel's portrayal of Anglo-French misunderstandings has often been regarded as semi-autobiographical.

== Reception ==
The Blessing received generally positive reviews upon publication and was praised for Mitford's wit, dialogue, and observations of French society. Evelyn Waugh described the novel as "deliciously funny". Contemporary reviewers particularly admired Mitford's depiction of postwar Paris and her satirical treatment of marriage and social convention.

Although critics have usually regarded The Pursuit of Love and Love in a Cold Climate as Mitford's finest achievements, The Blessing has remained one of her best-known later novels and is frequently cited as one of the sharpest fictional portrayals of Anglo-French cultural differences in postwar literature.

== Adaptations ==
The novel was adapted into the 1959 film Count Your Blessings, directed by Jean Negulesco and starring Deborah Kerr, Rossano Brazzi, and Maurice Chevalier.
