= Wigs on the Green =

1935 novel by Nancy Mitford

- First edition
- Author: Nancy Mitford
- Cover artist: Bip Pares
- Language: English
- Genre: Humorous fiction Roman à clef
- Publisher: Thornton Butterworth
- Publication date: 1935
- Publication place: United Kingdom
- Media type: Print (Hardback & Paperback)
- Pages: 253
- OCLC: 701770530

Wigs on the Green is a 1935 satirical novel by Nancy Mitford. A roman à clef, it is notable for lampooning British fascism, specifically political enthusiasms of Mitford's sisters Unity Mitford and Diana Mosley.

Using her sisters' wild fervour for fascism (and, in Unity's case, Nazism) as fodder for her satire, Mitford centred her plot around the character of Captain Jack (based on Sir Oswald Mosley, her sister Diana's future husband), the leader of the Union Jackshirts (based on the British Union of Fascists), and Eugenia Malmains (based on Mitford's sister Unity.) Always fond of cruel teasing, she was taken aback when Diana Mitford took offence to the novel and tried to placate her sister by excising the three chapters that dealt directly with the Captain Jack character. The novel still created a deep rift between the sisters.

When asked to republish the book after World War II, Mitford declined. The book was never republished in her lifetime, but 2010 saw its first reprint in the United Kingdom and the United States in more than 35 years.
