= U and non-U English =

Social class-based varieties of English

U and non-U English, where "U" stands for upper class and "non-U" represents the aspiring middle classes, was part of the terminology of popular discourse of social dialects (sociolects) in Britain in the 1950s. The different vocabularies often appeared counter-intuitive, with the middle classes preferring "fancy" or fashionable words, even neologisms and often euphemisms, in attempts to make themselves sound more refined ("posher than posh") and the upper classes using plain and traditional words that the working classes also used, as, confident in the security of their social position, they had no need to seek to display refinement. The upper class has also propagated its own class accent, Received Pronunciation, first noted in the very early 20th century. By the late 20th century the usefulness of these specific terms as signals of social class had decreased, and by the 2020s they had ceased to be reliable signals.

== History ==
The discussion was set in motion in 1954 by the British linguist Alan S. C. Ross, professor of linguistics in the University of Birmingham. He coined the terms "U" and "non-U" in an article on the differences social class makes in English language usage, published in a Finnish professional linguistics journal. Though his article included differences in pronunciation and writing styles, it was his remark about differences of vocabulary that received the most attention.

The upper class English author Nancy Mitford was alerted and immediately took up the usage in an essay, "The English Aristocracy", which Stephen Spender published in his magazine Encounter in 1954. Mitford provided a glossary of terms used by the upper classes (some appear in the table), unleashing an anxious national debate about English class-consciousness and snobbery. The essay was reprinted, with contributions by Evelyn Waugh, John Betjeman, and others, as well as a "condensed and simplified version" of Ross's original article, as Noblesse Oblige: an Enquiry into the Identifiable Characteristics of the English Aristocracy in 1956. Betjeman's poem "How to Get On in Society" concluded the collection.

The issue of U and non-U could have been taken lightheartedly, but at the time many took it very seriously. This was a reflection of the anxieties of the middle class in Britain of the 1950s, recently emerged from post-war austerities. In particular the media used it as a launch pad for many stories, making much more out of it than was first intended. In the meantime, the idea that one might "improve oneself" by adopting the culture and manner of one's "betters", instinctively assented to before World War II, was now greeted with resentment.

Some of the terms and the ideas behind them were largely obsolete by the late 20th century, when, in the United Kingdom, reverse snobbery led younger members of the British upper and middle classes to adopt elements of working-class speech, such as Estuary English or Mockney. By the 2020s, many of the words studied by Mitford had ceased to reliably signal social class.

=== American usage ===
A study in 1940 on the speaking differences between the American upper and middle classes revealed a strong similarity with the results of Ross's research. For instance, the American upper class said 'curtains', whilst the middle class used 'drapes'. Notably, the well-heeled would use 'toilet' whereas the less well-heeled would say 'lavatory', an inversion of the British usage.

== Examples ==
U	Non-U
Bike or bicycle	Cycle
Dinner jacket	Dress suit
Knave	Jack
Vegetables	Greens
Ice	Ice cream
Scent	Perfume
They've a very nice house	They've a lovely home
I was sick on the boat	I was ill on the boat
Looking-glass	Mirror
Chimneypiece	Mantelpiece
Graveyard	Cemetery
Spectacles	Glasses
False teeth	Dentures
Die	Pass on
Mad	Mental
Jam	Preserve
Napkin	Serviette
Sofa	Settee or couch
Lavatory or loo	Toilet
Rich	Wealthy
Good health	Cheers
Lunch	Dinner (for midday meal)
Pudding	Sweet
Drawing room	Lounge
Writing-paper	Note-paper
What?	Pardon?
How d'you do?	Pleased to meet you
Wireless	Radio
(School)master, mistress	Teacher

== See also ==
- Shibboleth
- Countersignalling
