= The Pursuit of Love =

1945 novel by Nancy Mitford

- First edition
- Author: Nancy Mitford
- Language: English
- Genre: Comic fiction
- Publisher: Hamish Hamilton
- Publication date: 1945
- Publication place: United Kingdom
- Media type: Print (hardback & paperback)
- Pages: 247
- OCLC: 667826867
- Followed by: Love in a Cold Climate

The Pursuit of Love is a novel by Nancy Mitford, first published in 1945. It is the first in a trilogy about an upper-class English family in the interwar period focusing on the romantic life of Linda Radlett, as narrated by her cousin, Fanny Logan. Although a comedy, the story has tragic overtones.

The book was an immediate best-seller and sold 200,000 copies within a year of publication.

Mitford wrote two sequels to the novel, Love in a Cold Climate (1949) and Don't Tell Alfred (1960). Her penultimate novel, The Blessing (1951), also makes references to The Pursuit of Love and characters from The Blessing later appear in Don't Tell Alfred.

== Plot summary ==
The narrator is Fanny, whose mother (called the "Bolter" for her habit of leaving lovers or husbands) and father have left her to be brought up by her aunt Emily and the valetudinarian Davey, whom Emily marries early in the novel. Fanny also spends holidays with her uncle, Matthew Radlett, her aunt, Sadie and numerous cousins at Alconleigh. Linda, the second Radlett daughter, is Fanny's best friend and the main character of the novel. The early chapters recount the Radlett children's bizarre upbringing, including their contrasting obsessions with hunting and preventing cruelty to animals, and the activities of their secret society, the "Hons". The Radlett daughters receive little in the way of formal education, and as Linda grows older she is increasingly consumed by a desire for romantic love and marriage.

Louisa, the eldest Radlett child, makes her début and quickly becomes engaged to John Fort William, a Scottish peer more than twenty years her senior. Linda finds Lord Fort William an unromantic choice of husband, but is deeply jealous that Louisa is getting married. Linda becomes bored and depressed, awaiting her own coming-out party. During this time she makes friends with Lord Merlin, a neighbouring landlord who is a wealthy, charming aesthete with many fashionable friends. Merlin brings Tony Kroesig, heir to a wealthy banking family, as a last-minute guest to Linda's coming-out ball. Linda falls in love with Tony, but their relationship is rocky from the start. Linda's father Matthew disapproves of Tony's German ancestry (he believes that all foreigners are fiends) and is furious when Linda and Fanny sneak away to Oxford to have luncheon with Tony. Linda and Tony eventually marry despite the strong disapproval of their families.

Linda very quickly realises that she has made a serious mistake, but she keeps up a pretence of having a happy marriage. Linda and Tony have one child, Moira, to whom Linda takes an instant dislike. Linda almost dies during Moira's birth, and her doctors strongly advise her to have no more children. Moira is soon abandoned to the care of her paternal grandparents. During this time, Fanny marries a young man called Alfred and begins a family of her own; she therefore sees Linda less frequently.

After nine years of marriage, Linda leaves Tony for Christian Talbot, an ardent Communist. Christian is kind but vague, and ultimately uninterested in individuals, preferring to focus on the plight of the working class. Linda's divorce and remarriage cause a rift between her and her parents, but after some months they reconcile. Linda and Christian go to France to work with Spanish refugees in Perpignan during the Spanish Civil War, where they meet Linda's old friend Lavender Davis, an efficient young woman also volunteering to help the refugees. Linda realises that Christian and Lavender are falling in love with one another and that they would be a better pairing. Linda decides to leave Christian and leave France.

On the way back to England, Linda runs out of money in Paris and meets Fabrice de Sauveterre, a wealthy French duke. Linda becomes his mistress and lives with him in Paris for eleven months. During this time she cultivates a great interest in clothes, which Fabrice encourages and finances, but most of her happiness is the result of the fact that she has finally found the love of her life. When World War II breaks out, Fabrice persuades Linda to return to England alone, for he has work to do in the French Resistance. During the war, he is able to visit Linda in England once. She becomes pregnant.

Meanwhile, for safety during the London Blitz, Fanny, Louisa and their children are living at Alconleigh, along with Matthew, Sadie, Emily, Davey, the "Bolter" and her new lover Juan (whom Matthew calls "Gewan"). When Linda's house in London is bombed, she also goes to stay at Alconleigh. The Bolter sees Linda as a younger version of herself, which Linda resents, because she is certain that she has found the love of her life in Fabrice and will not run off from any more husbands. Fanny is also expecting a baby, and she and Linda give birth to their sons on the same day. Linda dies in childbirth, as the doctors had warned; around this same time, Fabrice is killed in the war. Fanny and her husband adopt Linda's child and name him Fabrice.

== The Radletts ==
- Uncle Matthew, "Lord Alconleigh"; an eccentric, bullying patriarch who periodically uses bloodhounds to hunt his children across the Oxfordshire countryside
- Aunt Sadie, an affectionate but somewhat ineffectual matriarch
- Louisa, the dependable, domestic eldest daughter
- Linda, beautiful and highly strung, the central character in The Pursuit of Love
- Bob, the eldest son, one of the few well-behaved Radlett children
- Jassy, Matt's inseparable friend, who is perpetually saving up to run away from home
- Matt, Jassy's inseparable friend, eventually runs away from Eton to fight in the Spanish Civil War
- Robin, the youngest son
- Victoria, the baby of the family, born when the older children are entering their teens. An irrepressible child, she appears more prominently in the sequel, Love in a Cold Climate

== Other characters ==
- Fanny Logan, the narrator, a cousin of the Radletts and Linda's best friend
- Fabrice de Sauveterre, a wealthy French duke, Linda's final lover and the great love of her life
- Emily Warbeck, Sadie's sister and Fanny's aunt
- Davey Warbeck, Emily's husband, a distinguished writer and critic, and also a hypochondriac who undergoes unusual remedies for the sake of his health
- The Bolter, for whom no other name is given, Fanny's mother and younger sister to Sadie and Emily; she is called the Bolter because of her many marriages
- Lord Merlin, a neighbour of the Radletts who befriends and mentors Linda, and introduces her to high society
- Tony Kroesig, Linda's first husband, a banker and later a Conservative MP
- Sir Leicester Kroesig, Tony's father, also a banker, who strongly dislikes Linda
- Moira Kroesig, Linda and Tony's child, whom Linda dislikes on sight
- Christian Talbot, Linda's second husband, an ardent Communist
- Lavender Davis, a childhood acquaintance of Linda's
- John Fort William, Louisa's husband, in the House of Lords
- Alfred Wincham, Fanny's husband, an Oxford don
- Juan, the Bolter's Spanish lover

== Development ==
The failure of her 1940 novel Pigeon Pie had cooled Mitford's desire to write, but in 1944, with the encouragement of her friend, writer Evelyn Waugh, she began planning a new novel. In March 1945, she was given three months' leave from where she worked to write it. (Note: Thompson 2003, p. 209) The Pursuit of Love is a heavily autobiographical romantic comedy in which many of her family and acquaintances appear in thin disguises. (Note: Hastings 1985, pp. 165–167) Despite the distraction of learning that her brother Tom had died fighting in Burma, she finished the book in June 1945. (Note: Thompson 2003, p. 204) Her publishers Hamish Hamilton were so impressed with the completed manuscript that they gave her an advance of £250. (Note: Thompson 2003, p. 219) In September, she went to Paris, returning to London in December 1945 for the publication of the novel.

== Reception ==
Upon publication it was, Hastings records, "an instant and phenomenal success ... the perfect antidote to the long war years of hardship and austerity, providing the undernourished public with its favourite ingredients: love, childhood and the English upper classes". Within three weeks of its publication it had earned Mitford £798, more than she had received for her previous novels, combined. (Note: Thompson 2003, p. 235) Within six months she had earned £7,000 and by the end its first year it had sold 200,000 copies, and firmly established Mitford as a best-selling author. (Note: Hastings 1985, p. 168)

== Adaptations ==
In 1980 The Pursuit of Love and Love in a Cold Climate were adapted into an eight part miniseries by ITV under the title Love in a Cold Climate.

A second adaptation of The Pursuit of Love and Love in a Cold Climate by the BBC and WGBH Boston was released in 2001 as the two-part drama Love in a Cold Climate. Tom Hooper directed the screenplay adapted by Deborah Moggach from the novels.

In 2019 the BBC announced plans for another adaptation, The Pursuit of Love directed by Emily Mortimer and starring Lily James and Emily Beecham. The miniseries began filming in 2020; it was disrupted by the COVID-19 pandemic, and premiered on BBC One in May 2021.

In 2022 India Knight published the novel Darling, an updating of The Pursuit of Love set in modern times featuring many of the same characters.

== See also ==
- The Pursuit of Laughter
- The Pursuit (album)

== Notes ==
=== Bibliography ===
- Hastings, Selina (1985). Nancy Mitford. London: Hamish Hamilton. ISBN 0-241-11684-8.
- Thompson, Laura (2003). Life in a Cold Climate: Nancy Mitford, Portrait of a Contradictory Woman. London: Headline Book. ISBN 0-7472-4574-6.
