= Christmas Pudding (novel) =

1932 novel by Nancy Mitford

- Author: Nancy Mitford
- Language: English
- Published: 1932
- Publisher: Thornton Butterworth
- OCLC: 19080300

Christmas Pudding is a novel by Nancy Mitford, first published in 1932. It tells the story of a Christmas spent in the Cotswolds during an outbreak of hoof-and-mouth disease, away from the busy city life of London.

== Characters ==
- Paul Fotheringay - A writer who has recently published his first successful novel "Crazy Capers", he is the protagonist. Much to his dismay, "Crazy Capers" has been dubbed the funniest book of the year; what the readers do not realise is that it was intended to be a tragic tale. He is advised to try writing a biography and duly heads to Compton Bobbin with the aim of reading the inaccessible diaries of Lady Maria Bobbin, a Victorian poet.
- Amabelle Fortescue - A rich courtesan who rents Mulberrie Cottage for a quiet country escape over the Yuletide period, near Compton Bobbin.
- Sally and Walter Monteath - A poor couple (originally appearing in Highland Fling) who are great friends with Amabelle Fortescue and opt to spend Christmas with her in Mulberrie Cottage.
- Michael Lewes (Lord Lewes) - He is madly in love with Amabelle Fortescue and is astonished to find that she is staying in a neighbouring cottage when he goes to stay at Compton Bobbin. He quickly becomes a suitor to Philadelphia Bobbin.
- Lady Bobbin - A rather stern lady who thoroughly enjoys hunting and outdoor activities and hates Socialism.
- Philadelphia Bobbin - Lady Bobbin's daughter is intelligent but undereducated and lonely stuck in the country. She becomes torn between her attractions to Paul and Michael.
- Sir Roderick (Bobby) Bobbin - Lady Bobbin's son, who does not share his mother's interest for hunting and sport, he is more inclined to sleep for as many hours of the day as possible or attend parties with his friends. He happily agrees to help Paul Fotheringay gain access to his great-grandmother's journals by persuading his mother that Paul "Fisher" is a knowledgeable gentleman who will tutor him during the holiday period.
