= Love in a Cold Climate (1980 TV series) =

- Isabelle Amyes, Michael Williams, Judi Dench, and Michael Aldridge (above), Rosalyn Landor and Lucy Gutteridge (below)
- Genre: Drama
- Based on: The Pursuit of Love and Love in a Cold Climate by Nancy Mitford
- Written by: Nancy Mitford
- Screenplay by: Simon Raven
- Directed by: Donald McWhinnie
- Starring: Lucy Gutteridge; Rosalyn Landor; Michael Aldridge; Judi Dench; Vivian Pickles; Isabelle Amyes; Jean-Pierre Cassel.
- Music by: Julian Slade Arr. Alfred Ralston
- Country of origin: United Kingdom
- Original language: English
- No. of series: 1
- No. of episodes: 8

Production
- Producer: Gerald Savory
- Running time: 420 minutes
- Production company: Thames Television

Original release
- Network: ITV
- Release: 29 October – 17 December 1980

Love in a Cold Climate is a 1980 British television series produced by Thames Television. It is an adaptation of the Nancy Mitford novels The Pursuit of Love (1945) and Love in a Cold Climate (1949), set between 1924 and 1940, with a screenplay adaptation by Simon Raven. It was originally broadcast on the ITV network in eight episodes. The series starred Lucy Gutteridge, Rosalyn Landor, Michael Aldridge, Judi Dench, Vivian Pickles and Jean-Pierre Cassel.

== Production ==
The filming of the serial has been described as "most uncharacteristically relaxed" for the actors, as it had been scheduled during what proved to be a long-running dispute between ITV and the Association of Cinematograph, Television and Allied Technicians union. At first, there was a work-to-rule, and the actors were not called until 11 a.m., with filming ending at about 4 p.m. The dispute then escalated into a full strike, and filming was abandoned, with the actors being paid a retainer until it could be resumed.

== Cast ==
- Judi Dench as Aunt Sadie (Lady Alconleigh)
- Michael Aldridge as Uncle Matt (Matthew Radlett, Lord Alconleigh)
- Michael Williams as Davey Warbeck
- Lucy Gutteridge as Linda
- John Moffatt as Lord Merlin
- Isabelle Amyes as Fanny
- Vivian Pickles as Lady Montdore
- Job Stewart as Boy Dougdale
- Rosalyn Landor as Lady Polly Hampton
- Rebecca Saire as Victoria
- Christopher Scoular as Alfred
- Richard Hurndall as Lord Montdore
- Michael Cochrane as Cedric Hampton
- Yolande Palfrey as Jassy
- Selena Carey-Jones as Louisa
- Max Harris as Little Matt
- Jean-Pierre Cassel as Fabrice, duc de Sauveterre
- Patience Collier as duchesse de Sauveterre
- Anthony Head as Tony Kroesig
- Peter Howell as Duke of Paddington
- Joshua Le Touzel as Bob
- David Parfitt as Little Matt
- Leon Eagles as Sir Leicester Kroesig
- Daphne Neville as Lady Kroesig
- Diana Fairfax as Emily Warbeck
- Adrienne Corri as Veronica Chaddesley-Corbett
- Noel Johnson as Lord Stromboli
- Ralph Lawson as Christian Talbot
- Ann Queensberry as Lady Patricia
- Richard Beale as Josh
- Michael Lees as Lord Fort-William
- Amanda Boxer as Young Baroness
- Sheila Brennan as The Bolter
- Anthony Higgins as Juan
- Suzanne Burden as Lavender Davis
- Michael Elwyn as Roly
- Tamzin Neville as Linda
- Kate Valentine as Fanny
- Katherine Kath as Old Countess
- Simon Lack as Doctor
- Emma Higginson as Victoria
- Geoffrey Lumsden as Sir Archibald Curtly
- Pamela Pitchford as Mrs Hunt
- Michael Jayes as Robert Parker
- Gillian Maude as Germaine
- Gérard Falconetti as Barman
