= Love in a Cold Climate =

1949 novel by Nancy Mitford

- First edition (publ. Hamish Hamilton)
- Author: Nancy Mitford
- Language: English
- Genre: novel of manners
- Set in: England, 1930–31
- Publisher: Hamish Hamilton
- Publication place: United Kingdom
- Media type: Print: octavo
- Pages: 284
- OCLC: 1106567520
- Dewey Decimal: 823.914
- LC Class: PZ3 .M6972
- Preceded by: The Pursuit of Love
- Followed by: Don't Tell Alfred
- Website: www.nancymitford.com/books/love-cold-climate-1949/

Love in a Cold Climate is a novel by Nancy Mitford, first published in 1949. The title is a phrase from George Orwell's novel Keep the Aspidistra Flying (1936), but it in turn was based on a sentence in a 1797 letter by Robert Southey: She has made me in love with a cold climate, and frost and snow, with a northern moonlight. He was referring to Mary Wollstonecraft's correspondence from Sweden and Norway.

Love in a Cold Climate is a companion volume to The Pursuit of Love. The time frame of Love in a Cold Climate is the same as The Pursuit of Love, but the focus is on a different set of characters. Fanny remains the fictional narrator. In The Pursuit of Love, Fanny narrates the story of her cousin Linda Radlett. In Love in a Cold Climate, Fanny narrates the story of Polly, to whom Fanny is distantly related through her father's family.

== Synopsis ==
Lady Leopoldina "Polly" Hampton is the only child of the supremely aristocratic and very rich Earl of Montdore and his wife, Sonia. Lady Montdore is a product of the minor ranks of the aristocracy and her marriage to an earl is regarded as a social coup on her part. She is depicted by Fanny as an avaricious, greedy snob, but not without charm. Her thrusting personality, allied to her husband's impeccable social standing, riches and political influence makes her a formidable woman. Lady Montdore, unbeknownst to Lord Montdore, takes advantage of her husband's reputation to forward her own career as a hostess and manipulator of her social circle. Their daughter is Polly, with whom Fanny loses contact when Lord Montdore is sent as Viceroy of India.

Fanny receives an invitation to visit the Montdores upon their return from India. She has great affection for Polly, but Polly reveals little of herself. Polly has "come out" in India and as a beautiful and socially important debutante is expected to have a very successful season in London. However, Polly consistently demonstrates a total lack of interest in the London season and all of the men she meets. She is hoping that "in a cold climate", society will be less interested in love affairs. Lady Montdore is exasperated by her daughter's apparent indifference to love and marriage. "Important" potential suitors acknowledge that Polly is very beautiful, but find her cold and aloof. Polly reveals to no one that she has been in love with her uncle, "Boy" Dougdale (the husband of her paternal aunt), since she was 14. Boy is snobbish and sexually rapacious; his many affairs are common knowledge to both his wife and society at large. Fanny and her Radlett cousins have long suspected that the sexually ambiguous Boy has paedophilic tendencies, and he is a joke amongst Fanny's cousins for his inappropriate touches and "lecherous" behaviour towards young girls. Polly marries Boy shortly after her aunt's death, causing a scandal in her social circle and distressing her parents deeply. Unbeknownst to Polly, Boy has been Lady Montdore's lover for many years. She is excluded from her father's will upon her marriage and she and Boy ostracised from society. They move to Sicily, where they remain for several years.

Polly's place in the family is filled by the heir to Lord Montdore's entailed fortune and title, Cedric Hampton. Born in Nova Scotia to a minor member of the Montdore family, Cedric has used his exceptional good looks and personal charm to establish a place within the homosexual milieu of the European aristocracy. He has lived a life of luxury as the lover of rich and aristocratic men. Cedric accepts an invitation to visit the Montdores. His natural love of beauty, innate good taste, and careful use of flattery enable Cedric to win the affections of Lord and Lady Montdore and many others. Cedric focuses his attentions upon Lady Montdore who uses Cedric's popularity and charm to reestablish herself as a leading society hostess, to Cedric's advantage.

Fanny and Cedric soon become close friends. Polly and Boy return from Sicily, out of love and their marriage turned sour. While pregnant, Polly is regularly visited by the Duke of Paddington (a fictional title), who lavishes her with attention. There comes a reconciliation between Polly and Lady Montdore, Polly having borne a child who lived for minutes. "Cedric arranged the whole thing perfectly", according to Fanny. While Polly recovers from the difficult birth, Cedric, Boy and Lady Montdore go to France, leaving Polly free to be carried off by the duke. The trio return to Hampton and happily establish a ménage there. While this outcome shocks the conservative social circles in which they mix, Fanny takes a more broad-minded view, pleased to see people she loves each finding happiness in their own way.

== Characters ==
- Leopoldina "Polly" Hampton, the daughter of Lord and Lady Montdore, is renowned for her beauty but not much else.
- Sonia (née Perrotte), Lady Montdore, Polly's abrasive, narcissistic and inconsiderate mother
- Lord Montdore, Polly's kindly and rather dull father and the previous Viceroy of India
- Frances "Fanny" Wincham (née Logan), the narrator, is a distant cousin of Polly and a frequent visitor of the family.
- Linda Radlett, Fanny's cousin and best friend, daughter of Lord and Lady Alconleigh. Her relationships form a central part of the story in The Pursuit of Love.
- Louisa Radlett, eldest daughter of Lord and Lady Alconleigh, marries Lord Fortwilliam.
- Cedric Hampton, the heir to Hampton and a close friend of Fanny's, is flagrantly homosexual and extremely charming. He causes a great deal of gossip and scandal, yet most people are won over by his charm once they meet him. Once he arrives at Hampton, he spends most of his time making over his aunt.
- Harvey "Boy" Dougdale, husband of Lord Montdore's sister Patricia and later the husband of Polly Hampton. Boy is bisexual and known for his extremely active sex life.
- Lady Patricia Dougdale (née Hampton), whom Polly is said to resemble, is married to Boy Dougdale. Patricia pined for Boy for several years before he finally married her, but within six months of the wedding Patricia became aware of her husband's extramarital affairs. She was long afflicted with ill health and her death is a major plot point in the story.
- Davey Warbeck, Fanny's uncle and close friend of the Montdores and the Alconleighs
- Jassy Radlett, Fanny's cousin, is a regular visitor who never fails to cheer up Fanny.
- Victoria Radlett, Jassy's younger sister, and likewise one of Fanny's most welcome visitors
- Matthew Radlett, Lord Alconleigh, father of Jassy and Victoria and uncle to Fanny, is notable for his intense loathing of Cedric Hampton.
- Sadie Alconleigh, Fanny's aunt and mother of Jassy and Victoria, is a close friend of the Montdores.
- Alfred Wincham, an Oxford don and Fanny's husband. Although Fanny often claims that she and her husband are perfectly suited for one another, Alfred is often dismissive of his wife's behaviour and interests.
- Norma Cozens, Fanny's neighbour, is one of her closest friends despite their many differences in temperament.
- Veronica Chaddesley-Corbett, the most popular and prominent socialite of her day and an important visitor at Hampton
- Fabrice de Sauveterre, a wealthy French duke and a guest at Hampton. Sauveterre is a major character in The Pursuit of Love.

== Sequel ==
Don't Tell Alfred (1960) is a sequel to the novel giving further insight into the married life of Fanny and Alfred.

== Television adaptations ==
Love in a Cold Climate has been adapted twice as a mini-series:

- in 1980 by Simon Raven for Thames Television (set 1924–1940) starring Lucy Gutteridge, Rosalyn Landor, Michael Aldridge, Judi Dench, Vivian Pickles and Jean-Pierre Cassel
- in 2001 by Deborah Moggach for the BBC starring Rosamund Pike, Elisabeth Dermot-Walsh, Celia Imrie and Alan Bates

Both versions were broadcast in the United States by PBS as part of Masterpiece Theatre.
