= Karl Tunberg =

American screenwriter (1907–1992)

- Born: March 11, 1907; Spokane, Washington, U.S.
- Died: April 3, 1992 (aged 85); London, England
- Occupations: Screenwriter & Film producer
- Children: Terence Tunberg

Karl Tunberg (March 11, 1907 − April 3, 1992) was an American screenwriter and occasional film producer. He received Academy Award nominations for Best Original Screenplay for Tall, Dark and Handsome (1941) and Best Adapted Screenplay for Ben-Hur (1959).

== Life and career ==
Born in Spokane, Washington, Tunberg's earliest writings included short stories, and a novel entitled While the Crowd Cheers, which was published in 1935 by the Macaulay Company. Karl Tunberg's story-telling talents soon attracted movie studios, and he was employed to write screenplays. In 1937, Karl signed a contract as a screenwriter for Twentieth Century Fox Film Corporation under Darryl Zanuck. In the early 1940s Karl Tunberg moved his seat of operations to Paramount Pictures. In the first phase of his career Tunberg typically collaborated with other writers, especially with Darrell Ware, a deft composer of musical comedies. Eventually (in the later 1940s, the 1950s, and the 1960s) Tunberg worked more frequently on his own. His first feature film was You Can't Have Everything (1937), after which he provided scripts for several comedies and musicals featuring such stars as Betty Grable, Sonja Henie, Deanna Durbin, Dorothy Lamour and Shirley Temple. Among his credits are My Gal Sal (1942), Standing Room Only (1944), Kitty (1945) both with Paulette Goddard, Because You're Mine (1952), Valley of the Kings (1954), Beau Brummell (1954), The Seventh Sin (1957), Count Your Blessings (1958), Libel (1959).

He is perhaps best known for Ben Hur (1959). As noted in many contemporary sources, in addition to Tunberg, who had written the first script for the project more than five years before the start of principal photography, Christopher Fry and Gore Vidal contributed to the screenplay during filming. Maxwell Anderson and S.N. Behrman are also mentioned as contributing writers in the film's commemorative booklet. The film's final onscreen writing credits created controversy when, in October 1959, the Writers Guild of America (WGA) awarded Tunberg sole screenplay credit, despite the objections of the film's director, William Wyler, who, in the film's commemorative booklet and elsewhere, claimed that Christopher Fry was more responsible than any other writer for the final screenplay. In response to Wyler's public outcries against their ruling, the WGA took out trade paper ads on November 20, 1959, in which they issued a statement reading, in part, "the unanimous decision of the three judges was that the sole screenplay credit was awarded to Karl Tunberg...The record shows the following: 1. Karl Tunberg is the only writer who has ever written a complete screenplay on Ben-Hur; 2. Karl Tunberg continued to contribute materials throughout the actual filming, and this material is incorporated in the final picture; and 3. Karl Tunberg alone did the necessary rewriting during the four months of retakes and added scenes. Mr. Christopher Fry himself was fully informed of the proceedings of the Guild. He has made it absolutely clear that he did not want to protest the decision of the Guild."

Karl Tunberg occasionally functioned as producer as well as writer – as in the case of The Imperfect Lady (1947) and Count Your Blessings (1958). In the 1960s, Tunberg also wrote screenplays for two major MGM productions, I Thank a Fool (1962) and Where Were You When the Lights Went Out? (1967). Tunberg was nominated for two Academy Awards.

In the early 1970s Karl Tunberg began writing segments for television series, but he used to tell family and friends that his favorite medium was always the large-screen motion picture.

Tunberg died in London in April 1992 and was cremated at Golders Green Crematorium.

== Selected filmography ==
- Shipyard Sally (1939)
- Public Deb No. 1 (1940)
- Ben-Hur (1959)
- I Thank a Fool (1962)
