= Job Stewart =

British actor (1934–1991)

Job Stewart (20 January 1934 – 23 October 1991) was a British stage and screen actor.

Born in Cape Town, South Africa, Stewart took to the stage in the 1950s, appearing in Shakespeare and in West End drama, then gained screen roles in film and on television.

Stewart was a close friend of Judi Dench and worked with her on Love in a Cold Climate (1980).

His last screen work was in Hong Kong in the mid 1980s and he died there in 1991, aged 57.

== On stage ==
- King Richard II (Winter Garden Theatre, Broadway, 23 October 1956 - 12 January 1957) as Page
- Romeo and Juliet (Winter Garden Theatre, Broadway, 23 October 1956 - 12 January 1957) as Peter
- Macbeth (Winter Garden Theatre, Broadway, 23 October 1956 - 12 January 1957) as Witch
- Troilus and Cressida (Winter Garden Theatre, Broadway, 23 October 1956 - 12 January 1957) as Nestor
- Hamlet (Broadway Theatre, 53rd Street, 16 December 1958 — 10 January 1959) as Osric
- King Henry V (Broadway Theatre, 25 December 1958 — 10 January 1959) as Nym
- Romeo and Juliet (City Center Theater, New York, 13 February 1962 - 18 March 1962) as Benvolio
- Saint Joan (City Center Theater, New York, 20 February 1962 - 18 March 1962) as Dauphin
- The Astrakhan Coat (Helen Hayes Theatre, 12 January 1967 - 28 January 1967) as Alain

== Film and television work ==
- Armchair Theatre: Man in a Moon (1957)
  - Tragedy in a Temporary Town (1958) as John Phillips
  - Wolf Pack (1958) as Lieutenant Anstey
  - Power and Glory (1963)
- Jezebel ex UK (TV series) (1963) as Dr Stannard
- Crane: Two Rings for Danger (1964) as Alphonse
- The Hidden Truth (TV series): The Guinea Pig (1964) as John Pershore
- The Old Wives' Tale (TV series) (1964) as Monsieur Chirac
- The Lift (1965) as Joe
- Play of the Month (BBC TV series): The Moon and Sixpence (1967) as Chess player
- Theatre 625: Lieutenant Tenant (1967) as Captain
  - Kittens Are Brave (1967) as Miles Jarvis
  - The Year of the Sex Olympics (1968) as Custard Pie Expert
- The Last Shot You Hear (1969) as Policeman
- The First Churchills (1969) as Lord Shrewsbury
- Galileo (1975) as Monk-Scholar
- Play for Today: A Child of Hope (1975) as Ernest Wentzel
- BBC2 Playhouse: An Affinity with Dr. Still (1979) as Weekes
- Love in a Cold Climate (1980) as Boy Dougdale
- The Professionals: Kickback (1980) as Russell
- Holding the Fort: Under a Cloud (1981) as Toby Millichap
- A Fine Romance: Furniture (1982) as Salesman
- Love in a Fallen City (1984)
- Kung Hei Fat Choy (1985)
