= Voltaire in Love =

1957 book by Nancy Mitford

First edition (publ. Hamish Hamilton)

Voltaire in Love is a popular history of the sixteen-year relationship between Voltaire and Émilie, the Marquise du Châtelet. Written by Nancy Mitford and first published in 1957, the book also explores the French Enlightenment. In March 1729 Voltaire was allowed to go back to France. In spite of his love for England, he had become homesick; like many a Frenchman, he could not stand the austerity. In well-to-do houses, according to him, there was no silver on the table; tallow candles were burnt by all but the very rich; the food everywhere was uneatable. The arts of society, the art of pleasing, were hardly cultivated, and social life very dull compared with that in France. Furthermore, the weather did not suit his "unhappy machine". He often said that his unhappy machine demanded a southern climate but that "between the countries where one sweats and those where one thinks, he was obliged to choose the latter."
