= Don't Tell Alfred =

1960 novel by Nancy Mitford

- First edition
- Author: Nancy Mitford
- Cover artist: Cecil Beaton
- Language: English
- Publisher: Hamish Hamilton
- Publication date: 1960
- Publication place: United Kingdom
- Pages: 248
- OCLC: 757838847
- Preceded by: Love in a Cold Climate

Don't Tell Alfred is a novel by Nancy Mitford, first published in 1960 by Hamish Hamilton. It is the third in a trilogy centred on an upper-class English family and takes place twenty years after the events of The Pursuit of Love and Love in a Cold Climate. It was Mitford's final novel, though she continued to produce works of biography for a number of years before her death in 1973.

== Plot ==
As in the previous novels, Don't Tell Alfred is narrated by Fanny, now middle-aged and dealing with her own problems. Her husband Alfred Wincham, an Oxford don, has long been settled at this university as the Waynflete Professor of Pastoral Theology but has now been named as the apparently unlikely British Ambassador to France. The novel suggests that this is a reward for the now "Sir" Alfred Wincham's "war work", but Fanny is unclear about her husband's role during this period. Fanny finds herself uprooted from Oxford and moving to a grand embassy in Paris. She is at first clumsy and naive about embassy life, but she is aided by Philip Cliffe-Musgrave. A former student of Alfred's and friend of the family, the young career diplomat, Philip, is at ease in the complex world of French politics and society. He and Fanny work together to find a way to dislodge the former ambassadress who has retained residence in the embassy and try to smooth the way for Alfred to concentrate on the complexities of his new position. Various characters in the novel often mutter, "Don't tell Alfred," when anything difficult or dramatic occurs in the day-to-day life of the embassy, hence the title. Fanny must also contend with her four free-thinking sons, her social secretary Northey (also her cousin Louisa's daughter) who spends more time leading a hectic social life in Paris, with a trail of suitors behind her, than actually working, and a grumpy gossip columnist who skews everything that happens at the embassy into embarrassing and untrue news stories.

Unlike the previous novels, The Pursuit of Love and Love in a Cold Climate, Fanny's narration focuses on her own life, rather than that of other people. This novel does provide details about the lives of some other characters from these novels and The Blessing, though these are incidental to Don't Tell Alfred.

== Publication information ==
- Mitford, Nancy. Don't Tell Alfred. 1960, London. (ISBN 0881845973)
