= Nancy Mitford =

English novelist and biographer (1904–1973)

The Honourable Nancy Mitford CBE
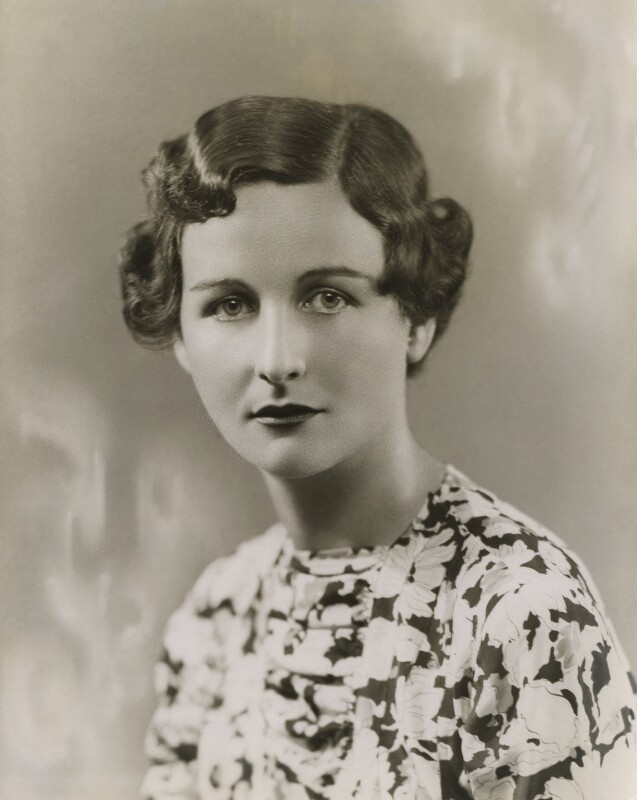
- Mitford in 1932
- Born: Nancy Freeman-Mitford; 28 November 1904; London, England
- Died: 30 June 1973 (aged 68); Versailles, France
- Occupations: Novelist; biographer
- Spouse: Peter Rodd (m. 1933; div. 1957)
- Parent: David Freeman-Mitford, 2nd Baron Redesdale (father)
- Relatives: Mitford family
- Writing career
- Notable works: The Pursuit of Love; Love in a Cold Climate; Noblesse Oblige

Nancy Freeman-Mitford (Note: Although "Freeman-Mitford" was the family's surname after 1886, neither Nancy nor her siblings appear to have used it outside formal documents. All Nancy's published work bears the name "Mitford", she specified the name "Mitford" in her CBE citation, and her gravestone bears the shortened name.) (28 November 1904 – 30 June 1973) was an English novelist, biographer, and journalist who was regarded as one of the "bright young things" on the London social scene in the inter-war period. She wrote several novels about upper-class life in England and France, and is considered a sharp and often provocative wit. She also has a reputation as a writer of popular historical biographies.

Nancy Mitford was the eldest of the Mitford sisters, six girls born to David Freeman-Mitford, 2nd Baron Redesdale and his wife Sydney Bowles (1880–1963), namely Nancy herself (born 1904), Pamela (1907), Diana (1910), Unity (1914), Jessica (1917) and Deborah (1920). The sisters had one brother, Tom (born 1909), who was killed in action in 1945.

Educated privately, Mitford had no training as a writer before publishing her first novel in 1931. This early effort and the three that followed it created little stir. Her two semi-autobiographical post-war novels, The Pursuit of Love (1945) and Love in a Cold Climate (1949), established her reputation.

Mitford's marriage to Peter Rodd (1933) proved unsatisfactory to both, and they divorced in 1957 after a lengthy separation. During the Second World War she formed a liaison with a Free French officer, Gaston Palewski, who was the love of her life. After the war, Mitford settled in France and lived there until her death, maintaining contact with her many English friends through letters and regular visits.

In 1954, Mitford published a tongue-in-cheek article drawing on the concept of U and non-U English as a marker of social class, recently developed by the British linguist Alan S. C. Ross. Many readers took her article seriously, and Mitford came to be considered an authority on matters of class.

Her later years were bittersweet, as the success of her biographical studies of Madame de Pompadour, Voltaire, and King Louis XIV contrasted with the ultimate failure of her relationship with Palewski. From the late 1960s onward, her health deteriorated, and she endured several years of painful illness before her death in 1973.

== Family ==
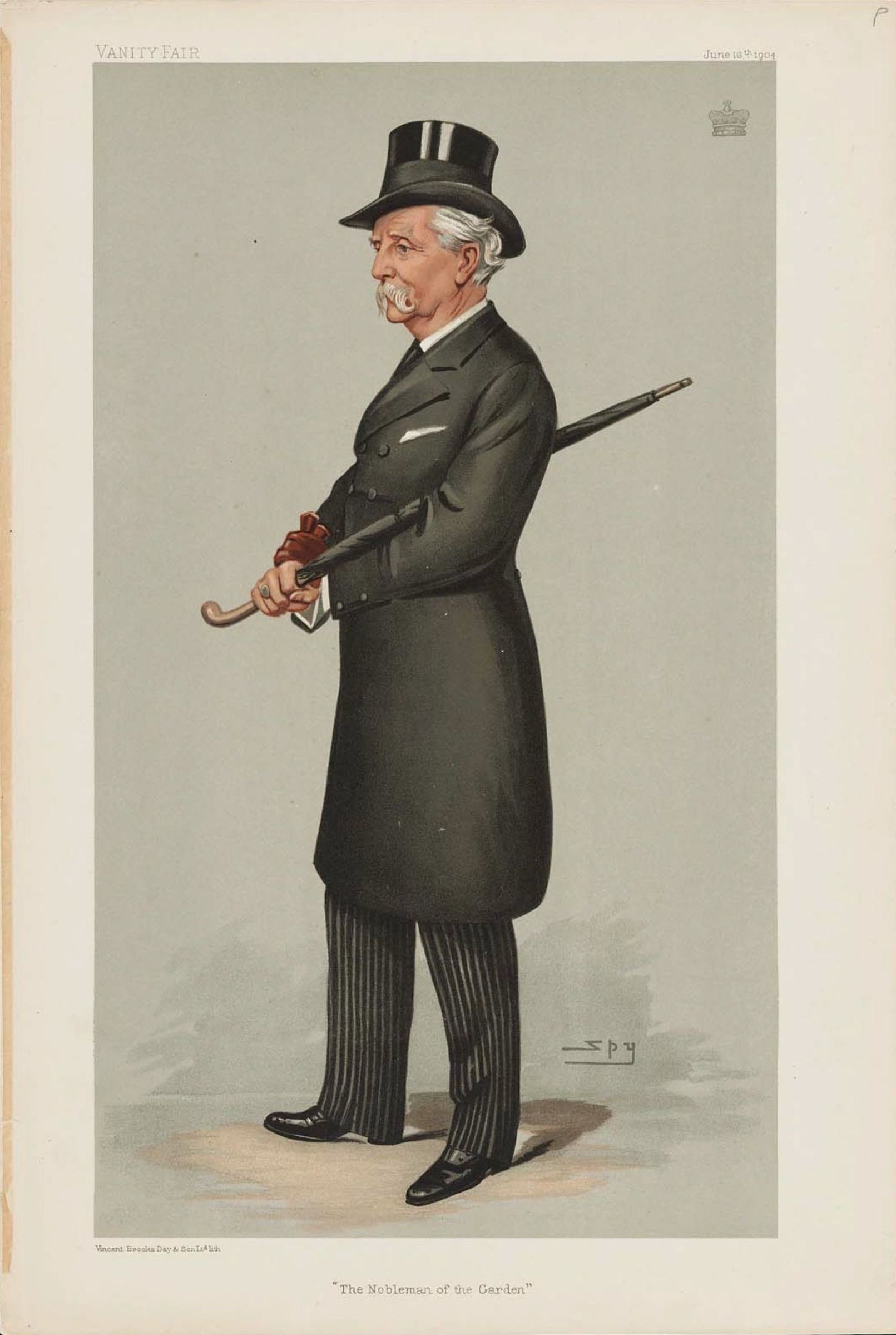
"Bertie" Mitford, created Baron Redesdale in 1902

The Mitford family dates from the Norman era, when Sir John de Mitford held the Castle of Mitford in Northumberland. A later Sir John held several important public offices during the late 14th and early 15th centuries, and the family maintained a tradition of public service for many generations. In the 18th century William Mitford was a leading classical historian, responsible for the definitive history of ancient Greece. His great-grandson (Algernon) Bertram Mitford, born in 1837 and known as "Bertie", was a diplomat and traveller who held minor office in Disraeli's second ministry, from 1874 to 1880.

In 1874, he married Clementina, the second daughter of David Ogilvy, 10th Earl of Airlie, a union that linked the Mitfords to some of Britain's most prominent aristocratic families. Blanche Ogilvy, Clementina's elder sister, became the wife of Sir Henry Montague Hozier, a soldier turned businessman. Their four children included daughters Clementine ("Clemmie"), who in 1908 married the future British Prime Minister Winston Churchill, and Nellie, who married Bertram Romilly.

Both Hozier and Blanche were promiscuous, and it is generally accepted by historians and family members that Hozier was not Clemmie's father although he was registered as such. Blanche told her friend Lady Londonderry, shortly before Clemmie's birth, that the father of the expected child was her own brother-in-law, Bertie Mitford. Most historians believe that other candidates for the paternity are more likely. (Note: Mary Soames, daughter of Clementine and Winston Churchill, considers the most likely father of Clementine to have been William George "Bay" Middleton (1846–92), a Scottish landowner, horseman and possible lover of Empress Elizabeth of Austria. Soames suggests that Bertie Mitford may have been the father of Nellie, Clementine's younger sister.)

Bertie Mitford's marriage produced five sons and four daughters. His career in government service ended in 1886 when, after the death of a cousin, he inherited a considerable fortune. A condition of the inheritance was that he adopt the surname "Freeman-Mitford". He rebuilt Batsford House in Gloucestershire, the family's country seat, served briefly as a Unionist MP in the 1890s and otherwise devoted himself to books, writings and travel. In 1902, he was raised to the peerage as 1st Baron Redesdale, a re-creation of a title that had previously been held in the family but had lapsed in 1886. (Note: William Mitford's brother John Freeman-Mitford, Speaker of the House of Commons and Lord Chancellor of Ireland, had been ennobled as Baron Redesdale in 1802. The title had lapsed on the death of the first Baron's son.)

=== Selective Mitford family tree ===
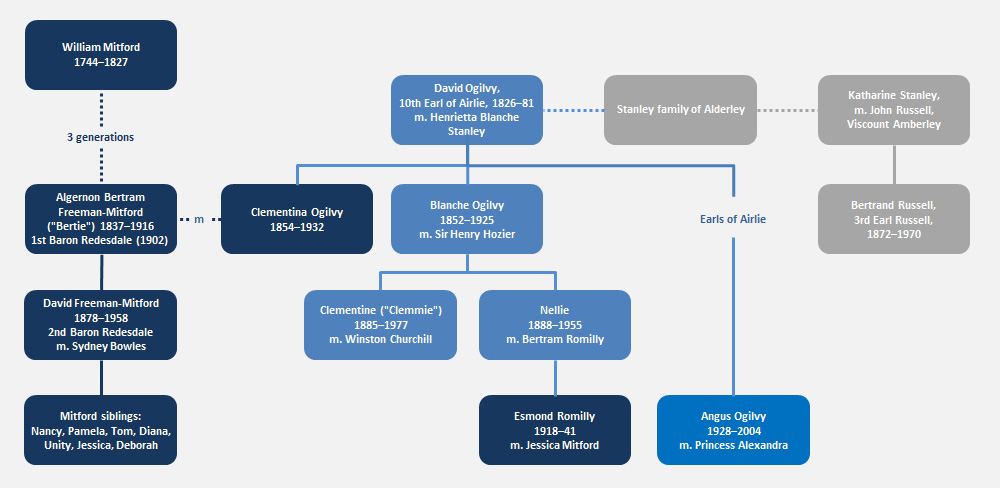
Chart showing some of the connections of the Mitford family, through marriages, to other leading families, including the Russells (dukes of Bedford), the Churchills (dukes of Marlborough) and, via Princess Alexandra, the British royal family. Deborah Mitford married Andrew Cavendish, who became the 11th Duke of Devonshire.

== Childhood ==
=== Parentage ===
Nancy Mitford's father, David Bertram Ogilvy Freeman-Mitford, was Bertie Mitford's second son, born on 13 March 1878. After several years as a tea planter in Ceylon he fought in the Boer War of 1899–1902 and was severely wounded. In 1903 he became engaged to Sydney Bowles, the elder daughter of Thomas Gibson Bowles, known as "Tap", a journalist, editor and magazine proprietor whose publications included Vanity Fair and The Lady. The couple were married on 16 February 1904, after which they rented a house in Graham Street in West London (no 1 Graham Terrace SW1). Bowles provided his son-in-law with a job, as business manager of The Lady magazine. David had little interest in reading and knew nothing of business; thus, according to Nancy Mitford's biographer Selina Hastings, "a less congenial post ... could hardly have been imagined". He remained in this position for 10 years. The couple's first child, a daughter, was born on 28 November 1904; they had intended to call her Ruby, but after she was born they changed their minds and named her Nancy.

=== First years ===
Responsibility for Nancy Mitford's day-to-day upbringing was delegated to her nanny and nursemaid, within the framework of Sydney's short-lived belief that children should never be corrected or be spoken to in anger. Before this experiment was discontinued, the young Nancy Mitford had become self-centred and uncontrollable; Hastings writes that her first years were "characterised by roaring, red-faced rages". Just before her third birthday, a sister, Pamela, was born; the nanny's apparent change of loyalty in favour of the new arrival was a further source of outrage to Mitford, and throughout their childhood and into young adulthood she continued to vent her displeasure on her sister.

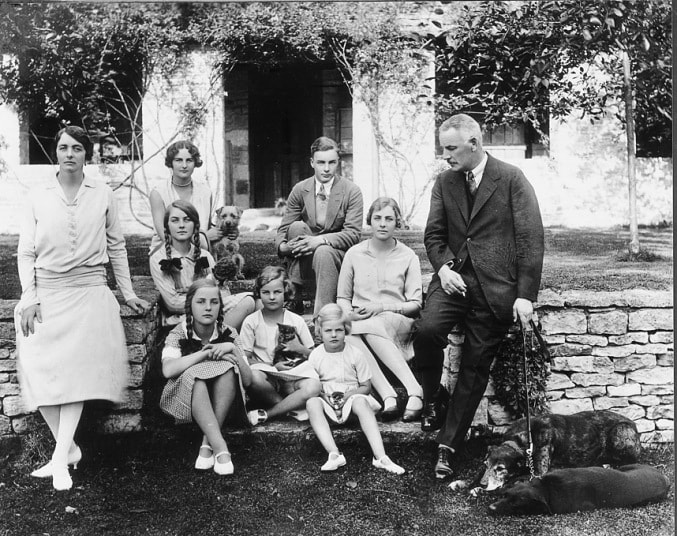
The Mitford family in 1928

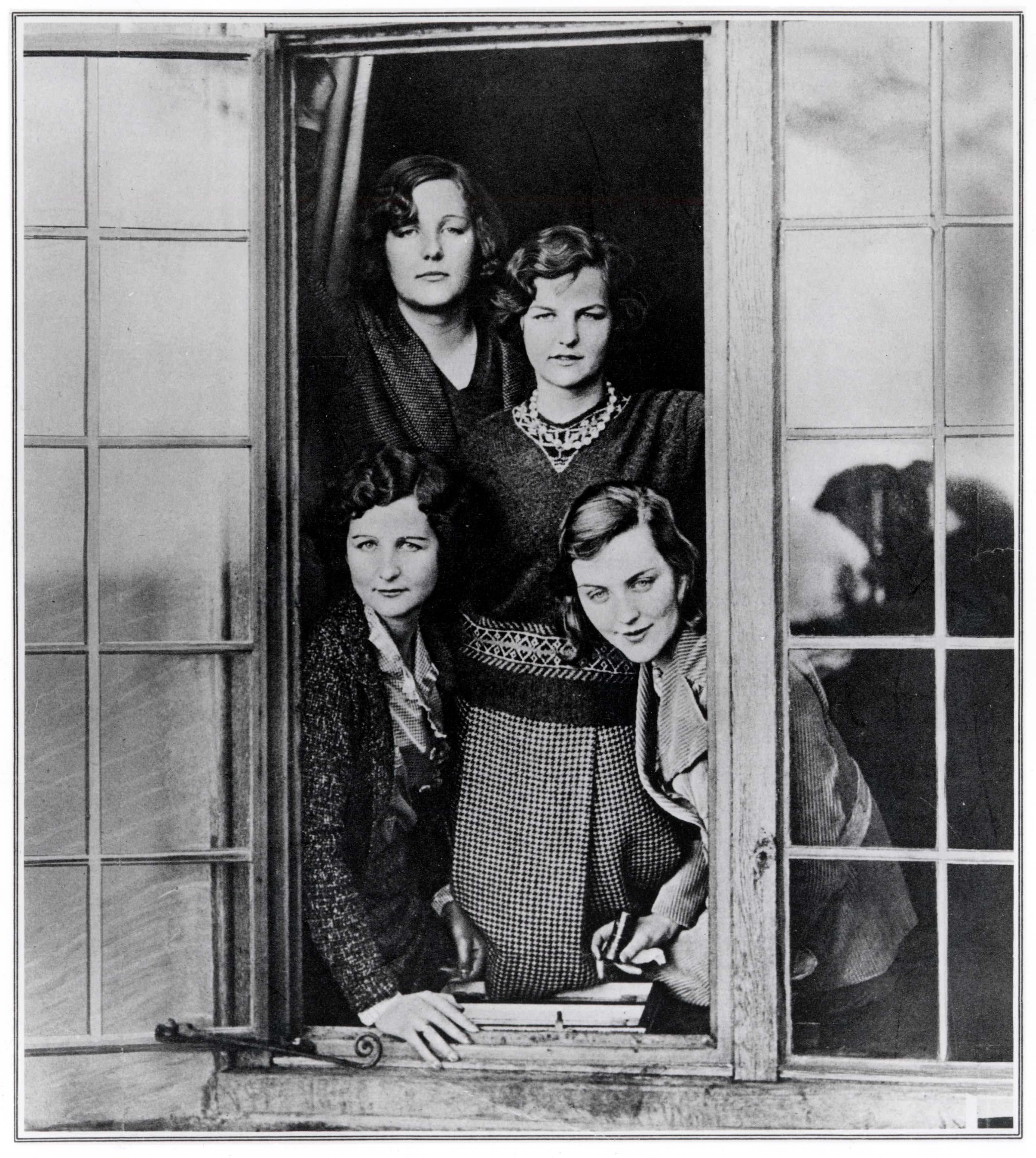
Nancy, Diana, Unity and Jessica Mitford on the cover of Sketch magazine in 1932

In January 1909 a brother, Tom was born, and in June 1910 another sister, Diana, followed. That summer, to relieve the pressure on what was becoming an overcrowded nursery, Nancy Mitford attended the nearby Francis Holland School. The few months she spent there represented almost the whole of her formal schooling; in the autumn the family moved to a larger house in Victoria Road, Kensington, after which Nancy was educated at home by successive governesses. Summers were spent at the family's cottage near High Wycombe, in Buckinghamshire, or with the children's Redesdale grandparents at Batsford Park. In the winter of 1913–14 David and Sydney visited Canada, prospecting for gold on a claim that David had purchased in Swastika, Ontario. It was here that their fifth child was conceived, a daughter born in London on 8 August 1914 and christened Unity.

=== War, Batsford Park and Asthall Manor ===
On the outbreak of the First World War on 4 August 1914, David re-joined his regiment and was soon in France. In May 1915, Clement, David's older brother, was killed while serving with the 10th Royal Hussars, which made David heir to the Redesdale title and lands. On 17 August 1916 Bertie Mitford died; David, still serving at the front, became the 2nd Baron Redesdale. Sydney quickly took possession of Batsford House, much of which had been shut up for many years, and occupied the portion of it that she could afford to heat. The children had the run of the house and grounds, and were taught together in the schoolroom. This was a source of frustration for Nancy, whose lively intelligence required greater stimulus. She spent many hours reading in the Batsford House library where, according to Hastings, the foundations of her intellectual life were laid.

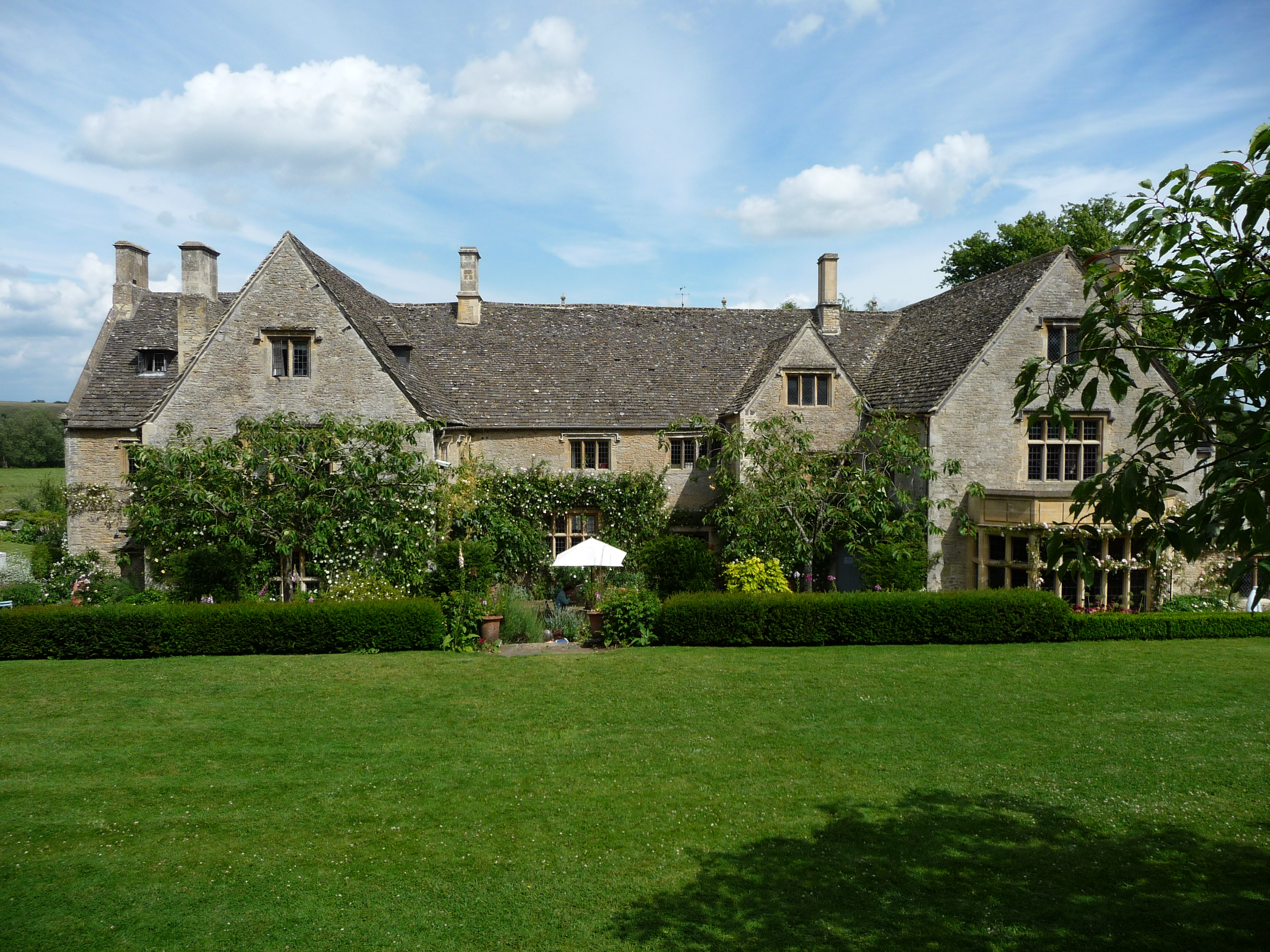
Asthall Manor, the Mitford family home between 1919 and 1926

The Redesdale estates were extensive, but uneconomical. At the end of the war Redesdale decided to sell Batsford Park and move his increasing family (a fifth daughter, Jessica, had been born in September 1917) to less extravagant accommodation. (Note: A sixth daughter, Deborah, was born in 1920. Hastings has recorded Lord Redesdale's disappointment that this final child was yet another girl; he had hoped for another son.) The house was sold early in 1919, together with much of its contents—including, to Nancy's great dismay, a large part of its library. The new family home was Asthall Manor, a Jacobean mansion near Swinbrook in Oxfordshire. This was intended as a short-term measure while a new house was built on land nearby. The family stayed in Asthall Manor for seven years, and it became the basis of many of the family scenes which Nancy was later to portray in her semi-autobiographical novels.

Growing up proved a difficult process for Nancy. Unable to form a relationship with Pamela, the sister nearest to her in age, she was bored and irritated by her younger siblings, and vented her feelings by teasing and tormenting them. Although there was undoubtedly cruelty in her taunting—the other children, led by Tom, formed a "Leag (sic) against Nancy"—her teasing was also, according to the later reflections of her nephew Alexander Mosley: "a highly-honed weapon to keep a lot of highly competitive, bright, energetic sisters in order. She used it ... as a form of self protection". Not all her interactions with her siblings were hostile; for their amusement she edited and produced a magazine, The Boiler, to which she contributed entertainingly gruesome murder stories.

In 1921, after years of pleading for proper schooling, Nancy was allowed a year's boarding at Hatherop Castle, an informal private establishment for young ladies of good family. Laura Thompson, in her biography of Nancy, describes Hatherop as not so much a school, "more a chaste foretaste of debutante life". Here Nancy learned French and other subjects, played organised games and joined a Girl Guide troop. It was her first extended experience of life away from home, and she enjoyed it. The following year she was allowed to accompany four other girls on a cultural trip to Paris, Florence and Venice; her letters home are full of expressions of wonder at the sights and treasures: "I had no idea I was so fond of pictures = ... if only I had a room of my own I would make it a regular picture gallery".

== Debutante and socialite ==
Nancy's eighteenth birthday in November 1922 was the occasion for a grand "coming-out" ball, which marked the beginning of her entry into Society. That was followed in June 1923 by her presentation at Court, a formal introduction to King George V at Buckingham Palace, after which she was officially "out" and could attend the balls and parties that constituted the London Season. She spent much of the next few years in a round of social events, making new friends and mixing with the "Bright Young People" of 1920s London. Nancy declared that "we hardly saw the light of day, except at dawn". In 1926 Asthall Manor was finally sold. While the new house at Swinbrook was made ready, the female members of the family were sent for three months to Paris, a period which, says Hastings, began Nancy's "lifelong love affair" with France.

Among Nancy's new London friends was Evelyn Gardner who, Nancy informed her brother Tom, was engaged "to a man called Evelyn Waugh who writes, I believe, very well". She and Waugh later developed a lasting friendship. Although she was now of age, her father maintained an aggressive hostility towards most of her male friends, particularly since, as Hastings remarks, these tended towards the frivolous, the aesthetic and the effeminate. Among them was Hamish St Clair Erskine, the second son of the 5th Earl of Rosslyn, an Oxford undergraduate four years Nancy's junior. He was, according to Hastings, the least suitable partner of all, "the most shimmering and narcissistic of all the beautiful butterflies"—and the one most likely to offend Lord Redesdale. The pair met in 1928 and became unofficially engaged, despite his homosexuality, of which Nancy may not have been aware. Against a backdrop of hostility from family and friends—Waugh advised her to "dress better and catch a better man"—the engagement endured sporadically for several years.

== Incipient writer ==
As a means of augmenting the meagre allowance provided by her father, Mitford began writing, encouraged by Waugh. Her first efforts, anonymous contributions to gossip columns in society magazines, led to occasional signed articles, and in 1930 The Lady engaged her to write a regular column. That winter, she embarked on a full-length novel, Highland Fling, in which various characters—mostly identifiable among her friends, acquaintances and family—attend a Scottish house-party which develops chaotically.

The book made little impact when it was published in March 1931, and she immediately began work on another, Christmas Pudding, illustrated by her close friend Mark Ogilvie-Grant. Like the earlier novel, the plot centres on a clash between the "Bright Young People" and the older generation. Hamish Erskine is clearly identifiable in the character of "Bobby Bobbin", and John Betjeman is the basis for the supporting role of Bobby's tutor. The thinly disguised caricatures pervading the book shocked Lady Redesdale, who thought it could not possibly be published under Mitford's own name.

The affair between Erskine and Mitford continued intermittently. While she often despaired of the relationship, she refused other offers of marriage, saying that she would "never marry anyone except Hamish." In 1932 her plight was overshadowed by a family scandal involving her younger sister Diana, who had married Bryan Guinness in 1928 and was the mother of two young sons. In 1932 Diana deserted her husband to become the mistress of Sir Oswald Mosley, the leader of the British Union of Fascists, himself married with three children. Almost alone of her family, Mitford offered her sister support, regularly visiting her and keeping her up to date with family news and social gossip. Her own love affair with Erskine came to an abrupt end when, in June 1933, he informed her that he intended to marry the daughter of a London banker. In a final letter after their parting, Mitford wrote to him: "I thought in your soul you loved me & that in the end we should have children & look back on life together when we are old".

== Marriage, writing and politics ==
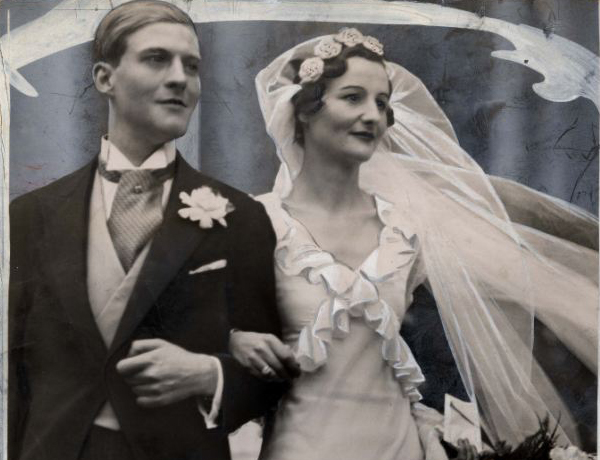
Mitford's marriage to Peter Rodd in 1933

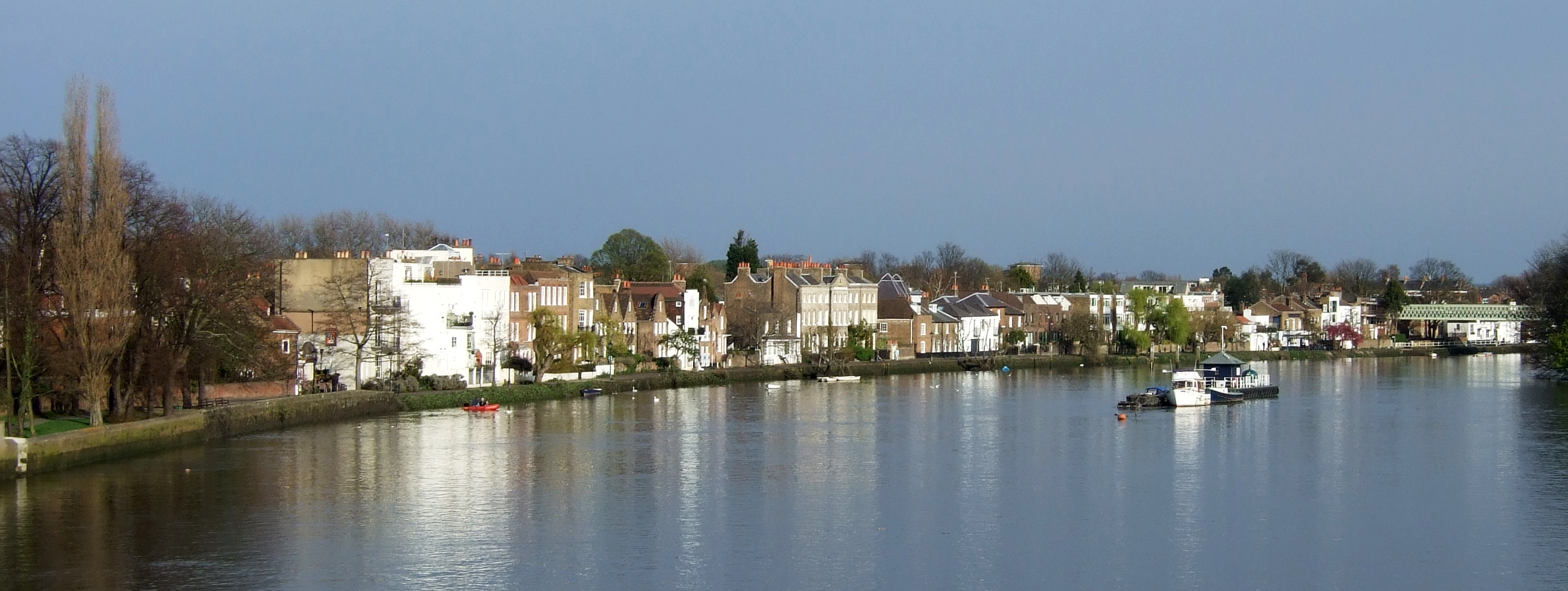
Strand-on-the-Green, seen from Kew Bridge

Within a month of Erskine's departure, Mitford announced her engagement to Peter Rodd, the second son of Sir Rennell Rodd, a diplomat and politician who was ennobled that year as Baron Rennell. According to Mitford's friend Harold Acton, Rodd was "a young man of boundless promise ... he had abundant qualifications for success in any profession he deigned to choose". Other biographers, however, describe him as being arrogant, pedantic, irresponsible, and unfaithful, as well as being a drinker and spendthrift who was unable to hold down a regular job. He was said to have been the model for Waugh's unscrupulous, amoral character Basil Seal from Black Mischief. Mitford and Rodd were married on 4 December 1933, and moved into a cottage at Strand-on-the-Green near Chiswick. Mitford's initial delight in the marriage was soon tempered by financial worries, Rodd's fecklessness, and her dislike of his family.

Mitford's sister Diana was an avid follower of the British fascist "Blackshirt" movement, led by her lover Oswald Mosley. Mitford herself flirted briefly with the movement, and in 1934 even attended one of Mosley's huge political rallies in Olympia, but her enthusiasm was short-lived and she soon became a vociferous opponent of the British Union of Fascists and of fascism generally. She was never able to take politics seriously, and found the political opinions of her sisters Diana and Unity, and their earnestness in defending them, to be deplorable. She responded with characteristic mockery in her third novel, Wigs on the Green, which satirised Mosley, fascism and Unity's unswerving enthusiam for the cause. When the novel was published in 1935, it aroused little critical interest, but it seriously offended members of her own family, particularly Diana and Unity. Diana eventually forgave Nancy, but Nancy's rift with Unity, who was outraged by her depiction in the book as the ridiculous "Eugenia Malmains", was never fully healed.

By 1936, when Mitford and Rodd moved to Maida Vale in London, their marriage was increasingly unhappy. Rodd was engaged in an affair with the wife of a friend, a situation that continued into the new year, when the Mitford family was further shaken by the 19-year-old Jessica's elopement with her second cousin Esmond Romilly. (Note: Esmond Romilly was the son of Nellie, Clementine Churchill's younger sister, but rumours suggested that Romilly was actually the product of an affair between his mother and her brother-in-law, Winston Churchill. There was a distinct physical resemblance between the young Churchill and Romilly. In his biography of Romilly, Kevin Ingram rejects the suggestion of Churchill's paternity as unfounded, possibly invented by Nancy as a tease.) A rebellious ex-Wellington schoolboy and avowed Communist, Romilly had fought on the Republican side in the Spanish Civil War. The young couple were traced to Bilbao, and Nancy was despatched to bring them home but failed to persuade them, and Jessica and Esmond were married in May 1937.

Through the winter of 1937–1938, Mitford's main literary task was editing the letters of her cousins the Stanleys of Alderley, with whom she was connected through her great-grandmother Blanche Airlie. Her preoccupation with the project, nine or ten hours a day she informed her friend Robert Byron, further damaged her relationship with Rodd, who resented the time she spent.

In the summer of 1938, Mitford discovered that she was pregnant. She had hoped for a girl: "2 Peter Rodds in 1 house is unthinkable", but in September she miscarried.

Early in 1939, Rodd left for southern France to work with the relief organisations assisting the thousands of Spanish refugees who had fled from General Francisco Franco's armies in the final stages of the civil war. In May, Mitford joined him and spent several weeks there as a relief worker. She was much affected by what she saw: "I have never cried so much in all my life". The experience hardened her antifascism to the extent that she wrote: "I would join hands with the devil himself to stop any further extension of the disease".

Having rejected the political extremes within her family, Nancy Mitford was a moderate socialist, but some of her works, such as her introductions to the Stanley letter collections, and her "U–non-U" essay of 1955, were staunch defences of the aristocratic traditions and values that she grew up with.

== Second World War ==
The outbreak of war in September 1939 divided the Mitford family. Nancy and Rodd supported the Allies in the war. The Romillys had by this time departed for America, (Note: In May 1940, after Hitler's invasion of the Low Countries, Esmond Romilly joined the Royal Canadian Air Force and after training as an observer was commissioned as a pilot officer. He was killed in November 1941 in the course of a bombing raid on Hamburg.) but the others either hoped for an Anglo-German détente or, as with Unity, were openly pro-Nazi. Unity was in Munich when war was declared. In despair, she attempted suicide by shooting herself in the head. She survived, and was sent home through neutral Switzerland. (Note: Although she made a partial recovery and lived a further nine years, the damage to Unity was permanent. The bullet proved impossible to remove and eventually caused a fatal attack of meningitis.) Mosley and Diana, who had married secretly in 1936, were detained under Defence Regulation 18B.

Nancy, in full anti-fascist mode, had described her sister to the British Intelligence agency MI5 as "a ruthless and shrewd egotist, a devoted fascist and admirer of Hitler [who] sincerely desires the downfall of England and democracy in general". (Note: Diana was unaware of Nancy's role in her imprisonment until many years after the war. Both remained on affectionate terms during the remainder of Nancy's lifetime. However, in a television programme in 2001 Diana described her sister as "the most disloyal person I ever knew".) During the "Phoney War" of 1939–1940, Nancy was briefly an Air Raid Precautions (ARP) driver, and later worked shifts at a first-aid post in Paddington. She drew on those experiences in her fourth novel, Pigeon Pie, a comedy about spying. It was published by Hamish Hamilton in May 1940, while there was little public appetite for lighthearted war satire, and the book was a commercial failure.

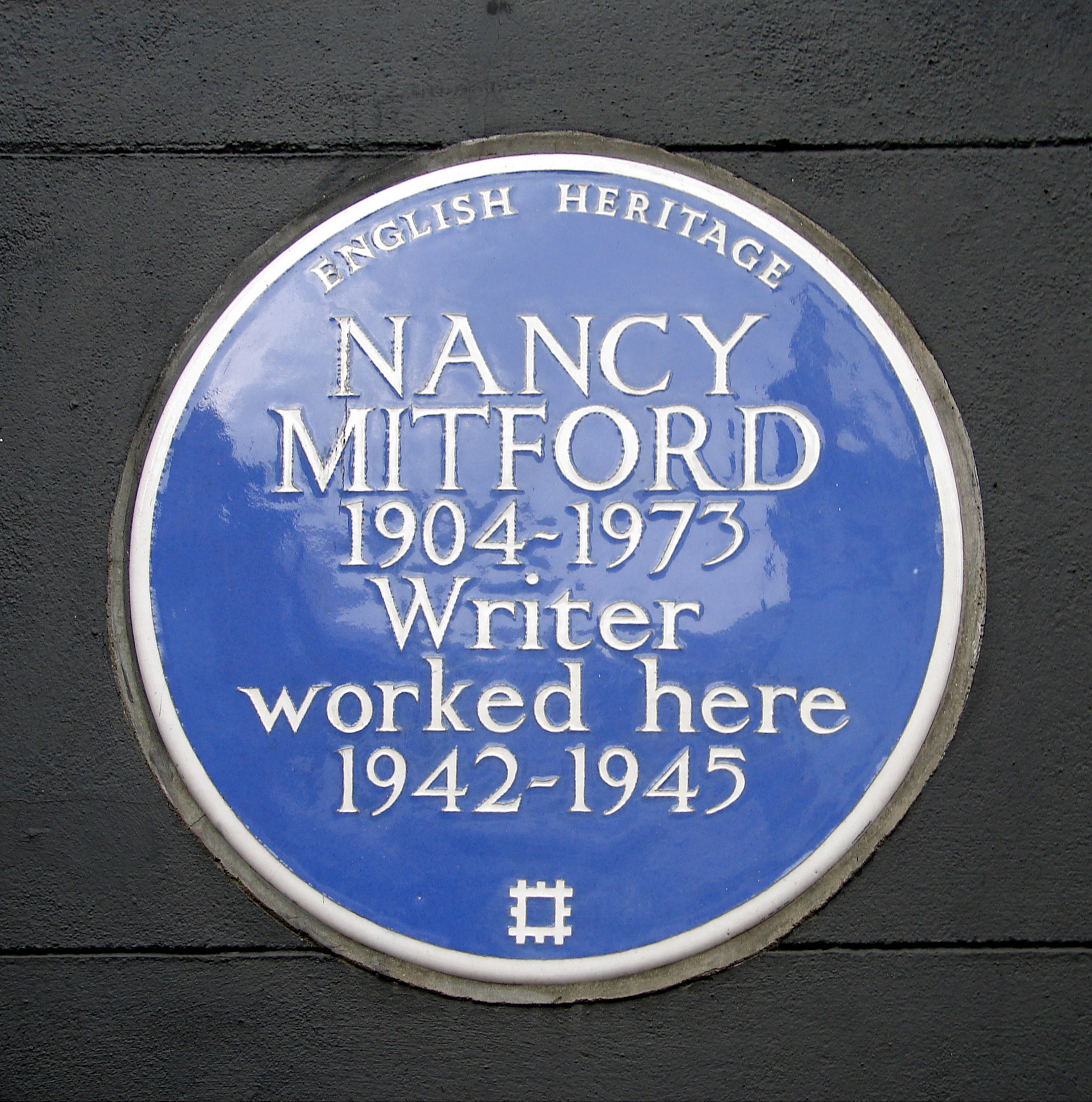
A commemorative plaque at the entrance to the Heywood Hill bookshop, Curzon Street

In April 1940, Mitford suffered her second miscarriage. Shortly afterward, Rodd, who had been commissioned into the Welsh Guards, departed overseas. Alone in London, Mitford moved to the family's Rutland Gate house where she remained during the London Blitz. The main house had been requisitioned to provide a refuge for Jewish families evacuated from the bombed areas of the East End. Mitford spent much of her time looking after those families: "so hard-working, clean and grateful".

A brief affair with a Free French officer, André Roy, resulted in a third pregnancy. Mitford again miscarried, with complications that led, in November 1941, to a hysterectomy. After convalescence, at loose ends, she began working as an assistant at the Heywood Hill bookshop in Curzon Street. (Note: The shop had been founded in 1936 by G. Heywood Hill. Mitford later bought a partnership in the business; her share was eventually passed to her nephew the Duke of Devonshire. Between 1995 and 2004, the shop sponsored a literary prize, which it revived in 2011 (in a revised form) to mark the bookshop's 75th anniversary.) The shop became the centre of Mitford's daily activities and was a favoured meeting place for London's literati.

In September 1942, she met Gaston Palewski, a French colonel attached to General Charles de Gaulle's London staff. She found him fascinating, and he became the love of her life though her feelings were never fully reciprocated. He was an inspiration for much of her future writing. For the sake of Mitford's reputation, the affair was pursued with discretion before Palewski left for Algeria in May 1943. Thereafter, the relationship was conducted mainly by letters and occasional phone calls since Palewski was only intermittently in England before the end of the war.

The failure of Pigeon Pie had cooled Mitford's desire to write, but in 1944, with Waugh's encouragement, she began planning a new novel. In March 1945, she was given three months' leave from the shop to write it. The Pursuit of Love is a heavily autobiographical romantic comedy in which many of her family and acquaintances appear in thin disguises. Despite the distraction of learning that her brother Tom had died fighting in Burma, (Note: Tom, strongly pro-German, had requested that he be sent to Burma to fight the Japanese, rather than to fight against Germans.) she finished the book and, in September, went to Paris. Ostensibly, that was to establish a French branch of Heywood Hill, but in reality, she wished to be close to Palewski, who was now a member of de Gaulle's postwar provisional government.

In December 1945, she was back in London for the publication of The Pursuit of Love which was, Hastings records, "an instant and phenomenal success ... the perfect antidote to the long war years of hardship and austerity, providing the undernourished public with its favourite ingredients: love, childhood and the English upper classes". The book sold 200,000 copies within a year of publication, and firmly established Mitford as a best-selling author.

== Move to Paris ==
At the end of the war, Rodd returned home, but the marriage was essentially over. Although remaining on friendly terms, the couple led separate lives. (Note: Rodd and Mitford were divorced in 1957, and he died in 1968.) Mitford's visit to France in late 1945 had revived her longing to be there, and in April 1946, having given up working in the shop the previous month, she left London to make her permanent home in Paris and never lived in England again. She was a prolific letter writer and kept contact with her large cohort of friends by a voluminous correspondence. According to Hastings, she developed many of her friendships far further on paper than she could have done through normal social intercourse.

=== Rue Monsieur ===
"I am so completely happy here ... I feel a totally different person as if I had come out of a coal mine into daylight ... Diana Cooper is being too angelic. I am captivated completely by her beauty and charm ... Oh my passion for the French!"

— Nancy Mitford, writing to her mother after deciding to live permanently in France.

During her first 18 months in Paris, Mitford lived in several short-term lodgings while she enjoyed a hectic social life, the hub of which was the British Embassy under the regime of the ambassador, Duff Cooper, and his socialite wife, Lady Diana Cooper. Eventually Mitford found a comfortable apartment, with a maid, at No. 7 rue Monsieur on the Left Bank, close to Palewski's residence. Settled there in comfort, she established a pattern to her life that she mostly followed for the next 20 years, her precise timetable being determined by Palewski's varying availability. Her socialising, entertaining and working were interspersed with regular short visits to family and friends in England and summers generally spent in Venice.

In 1948, Mitford completed a new novel, a sequel to The Pursuit of Love that she called Love in a Cold Climate, with the same country house ambience as the earlier book and many of the same characters. The novel's reception was even warmer than that of its predecessor. Waugh was one of the few critics to qualify his praise; he thought that the descriptions were good but the conversations poor. In 1950 she translated and adapted André Roussin's play La petite hutte ('The Little Hut'), in preparation for its successful West End début in August, The Times's critic noted the "habit of speech at once colloquial and unexpected which instantly declares itself the creation of Miss Mitford." The play ran for 1,261 performances, and provided Mitford with a steady £300 per month in royalties. The same year The Sunday Times asked her to contribute a regular column, which she did for four years. The busy period in her writing life continued in 1951 with her third postwar novel, The Blessing, another semi-autobiographical romance this time set in Paris, in which an aristocratic young Englishwoman is married to a libidinous French marquis. Harold Acton deems it her most accomplished novel, "permeated with her joyous love of France". This time Waugh (to whom the book was dedicated) had no criticism; he found the book "admirable, deliciously funny, consistent and complete, by far the best of your writings".

Mitford then began her first serious non-fiction work, a biography of Madame de Pompadour. The general view of the critics when the book was published in March 1954 was that it was "marvelous entertainment, if hardly to be taken as history". The historian AJP Taylor likened Mitford's evocation of 18th-century Versailles to "Alconleigh", the fictitious country house that formed the background to her recent best-selling novels, a comparison that she found offensive.

=== Noblesse Oblige ===
In 1954 Alan Ross, a University of Birmingham professor of linguistics, devised the terms "U" and "Non-U" to differentiate the speech patterns of the social classes in England. "U" indicated upper-class usage, and "Non-U" the conventions of the lower strata of society. His article, in a learned Finnish journal and with an illustrative glossary, used The Pursuit of Love to exemplify upper-class speech patterns. In a spirit of mischief, Mitford incorporated the U and Non-U thesis into an article she was writing for Encounter on the English aristocracy. Although the aspect formed only a small section of Mitford's article, when it was published in September 1955 it caused a major stir. Few recognised the tongue-in-cheek aspect. Mitford received hundreds of letters from worried readers desperate to know if they were snobs or merely "common". The level of anxious or amused interest was sustained to such an extent that in 1956 Hamish Hamilton reproduced the article in a short book, Noblesse Oblige. The book also included an abbreviated version of Ross's original article, (Note: An article in Language, the journal of the Linguistic Society of America, complained that too much of the original Ross article had been omitted, including everything related to pronunciation.) and contributions from Waugh, Betjeman, Peter Fleming and Christopher Sykes, It was a tremendous success; as Lovell records, "'U and Non-U' was the buzz phrase of the day ... Nancy's comments made her the arbiter of good manners for several generations". Thompson notes the irony that the U and Non-U labels, perhaps Mitford's best-known legacy, were not her own but were borrowed for the purpose of a "tease". (Note: The terms "U and Non-U" entered the language permanently; Thompson argues that the notoriety associated with Noblesse Oblige came to haunt Mitford, partly by branding her in some eyes as a "super-snob" and partly by distracting attention from her serious writing. The Daily Telegraph's obituary in 1973 was headed: "Nancy Mitford, U and Non-U creator, dies at 68".)

== Later career ==
In October 1957 Palewski was appointed as France's ambassador to Italy. Mitford's meetings with him, which had become increasingly rare because of his many political and social commitments, were now reduced to a single visit a year, supplemented with occasional letters. Mitford mainly concealed her true feelings on this separation, although one acquaintance noted her increasingly "savage" teasing of friends, which was perhaps a safety valve: "If she would only tell one she is unhappy one would do what one could to comfort her". In March 1958 Mitford's father, Lord Redesdale, died. After the cremation, she informed her sister Jessica, "the ashes were done up in the sort of parcel he used to bring back from London, rich thick brown paper & incredibly neat knots".

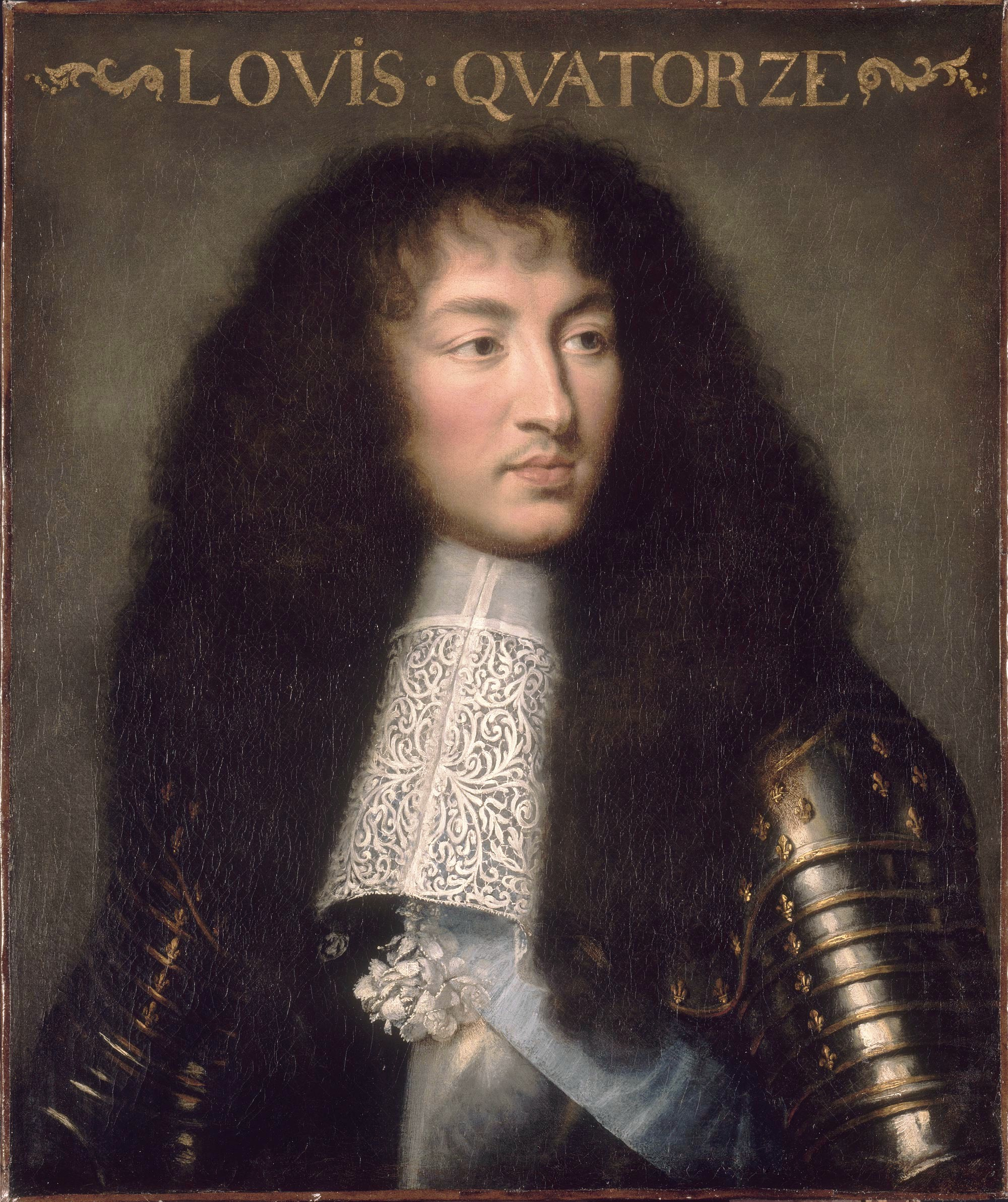
Louis XIV, "The Sun King", subject of Mitford's much-praised book

Meanwhile Mitford had completed her latest book, Voltaire in Love, an account of the love affair between Voltaire and the Marquise du Châtelet. She considered it her first truly grown-up work, and her best. Published in 1957, it sold well, was taken seriously by the critics and was warmly praised by Mitford's friends. Its writing had been hampered by painful headaches arising from her apparently failing eyesight and worries that she might be going blind. The problem was resolved after a visit to the ophthalmic surgeon Patrick Trevor-Roper, who gave her new spectacles: "It is heavenly to be able to read for a long time on end & now I see how handicapped I was when doing Voltaire". She then returned to writing fiction, with Don't Tell Alfred, in which she revived Fanny Wincham, the narrator of The Pursuit of Love and Love in a Cold Climate, and placed her in a Paris setting as wife of the British ambassador. Several characters familiar from the earlier novels appear in minor roles. The book, published in October 1960, was popular with the public, but received indifferent reviews. Some of Mitford's friends disliked it, and she decided she would write no more fiction.

In August 1962 Palewski was appointed a minister in Georges Pompidou's government, and returned to Paris. This did not mean more regular or frequent meetings, and the affair with Mitford continued at arm's length. (Note: Palewski had been conducting a simultaneous affair with another woman, a near neighbour of Mitford in Paris. In 1961 this woman bore Palewski's child. He assured Mitford that he had no intention of marrying the woman and saw no reason why his friendship with Mitford should not continue.) In April 1963 Mitford was in England for the wedding of her cousin Angus Ogilvy to Princess Alexandra. A month later she was back for the funeral of her mother, Lady Redesdale, who died on 25 May. Mitford's friends were dying, too, "in middle age", she informed her long-time friend Violet Hammersley. The premature deaths included that of Evelyn Waugh, who died on 10 April 1966. Mitford saw the kindness and humour concealed behind his hostile public image, and said after his death: "What nobody ever remembers about Evelyn is everything with him was jokes. Everything". Thompson calls their relationship "one of the great literary friendships of the twentieth century".

Amidst these personal upheavals Mitford continued writing. In 1964 she began work on The Sun King, a biography of Louis XIV. Her publishers decided to issue it as a lavishly illustrated "coffee table" book. When it was published in August 1966, among the many tributes to the book was that of President de Gaulle, who recommended it to every member of his cabinet. By this time, Mitford's relationship with Palewski had become dormant, and she recognised that the best days would never return. Under pressure from her landlords to leave her rue Monsieur apartment—they had raised her rent "exorbitantly"— she decided to leave Paris and buy herself a house in Versailles.

=== Final years ===
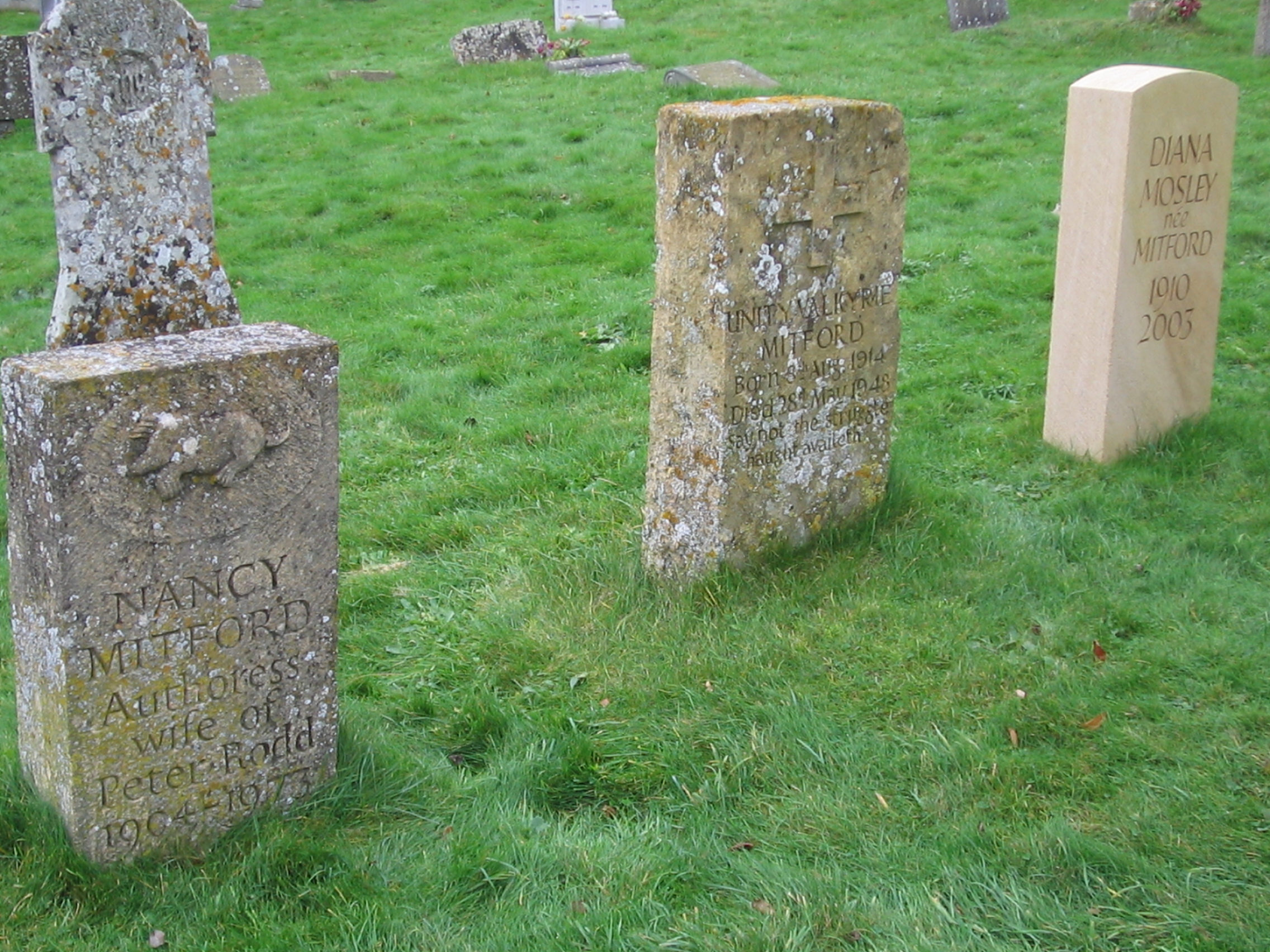
The graves in Swinbrook churchyard of (left) Nancy, (centre) Unity and (right) Diana, who died in 2003

Mitford moved to No. 4 rue d'Artois, Versailles, in January 1967. The modest house had a half-acre (0.2 hectare) garden, which soon became one of her chief delights. In 1968 she began work on her final book, a biography of Frederick the Great. While confined at home in March 1969 after a series of illnesses she learned from a newspaper announcement that Palewski had married the Duchesse de Sagan, a rich divorcée. Mitford had long accepted that Palewski would never marry her. Nevertheless, she was deeply hurt by the news, although she affected a typical nonchalance.

Shortly after, she entered hospital for the removal of a tumour. After the operation she continued to suffer pain, although she was able to continue working on her book. In October 1969 she undertook a tour of East Germany, to visit former royal palaces and battlefields. She finished the book, but in April 1970 was back in hospital for further tests, which did not lead to either a diagnosis or effective treatment.

Frederick the Great was published later in 1970 to a muted reception. Mitford's remaining years were dominated by her illness, although for a time she enjoyed visits from her sisters and friends, and working in her garden. In April 1972 the French government made her a Chevalier of the Légion d'Honneur, and later that year the British government appointed her a Commander of the Order of the British Empire (CBE). She was delighted by the former honour, and amused by the latter—which she remembered Waugh had called an "insult" and turned down.

At the end of 1972 she entered the Nuffield Clinic in London, where she was diagnosed with Hodgkin's lymphoma, a cancer of the blood. She lived for another six months, unable to look after herself and in almost constant pain, struggling to keep her spirits up. She wrote to her friend James Lees-Milne: "It's very curious, dying, and would have many a drôle amusing & charming side were it not for the pain". She died on 30 June 1973 at her home in the rue d'Artois and was cremated in Versailles, after which her ashes were taken to Swinbrook for burial alongside her sister Unity.

== Writings ==
=== Fiction ===
"For months, Nancy had sat giggling helplessly before the drawing-room fire, her curiously triangular green eyes flashing with amusement while her thin pen flew along the lines of a child's exercise book. Sometimes she read bits aloud to us".

— Jessica Mitford describes the genesis of Highland Fling.

Mitford had no training as a writer or journalist; her style, particularly in the pre-war novels, is chatty and informal, much as in her letters. She may have inherited some of her natural wit and sharpness of expression from her maternal grandfather Thomas Bowles, who in his youth during the Franco-Prussian War had provided dispatches which Acton describes as "extremely graphic and amusing". Mitford's fiction, based on upper-class family life and mores, belongs to the genre of the comedy of manners. Her protagonists—typically, intelligent women surrounded by eccentric characters determined to find life amusing—are broadly autobiographical.

It is unsurprising, says Thompson, that Mitford first attempted to write a novel in the early 1930s, since many of her friends were doing the same thing. What is surprising, Thompson adds, is the ease with which she found a publisher for this first book. Perhaps, says Thompson, her publishers Thornton Butterworth "liked the idea of this pretty, well-connected girl who wrote in the style du jour". Mitford was later embarrassed by her prewar novels; Rachel Cooke, writing on their reissue in 2011, believes she had no reason to be: "There is a special kind of energy here, and its engine is the admirable and irresistible commitment of a writer who would rather die than be boring".

Critics generally place the postwar novels in a different league from the earlier efforts; Cooke describes The Pursuit of Love as "an immaculate novel that soars many miles above what came before". In Acton's view it and its companion volume Love in a Cold Climate present an entirely authentic picture of country house life in England between the wars, and will long be consulted by historians of the period. In these later novels Zoë Heller of the Daily Telegraph hears in the prose, behind a new level of care and artfulness, "the unmistakeable Mitford trill, in whose light, bright cadences an entire hard-to-shock and easy-to-bore view of life is made manifest". At times a more serious undertone, contrasting with the "bright, brittle, essentially ephemeral" nature of her early works, becomes evident; Olivia Laing in the Guardian, discerns "a faint and beguiling pessimism about love's pursuit and its consequences" beneath the light superficiality.

The Blessing has provoked a more divided response. Waugh's judgement was that those who criticised the book were "lazy brutes ... [who] ... can't bear to see a writer grow up". More recently, Philip Hensher and others have argued that although the novel is immensely enjoyable and that Mitford's "marvellous voice" is undiminished, she is on less sure ground with her "Frenchness" than with the English country house ambience, and her picture of France as the embodiment of everything civilised is less than convincing. Similar mixed comments greeted Mitford's final novel, Don't Tell Alfred, Waugh again hailing it as her best, "clamouring for a sequel".

In this judgement he was largely alone. Other critics perceived in the anecdotal framework of the book an uncertainty as to what it was about. An American reviewer wondered what parts were to be taken seriously: "What exactly goes on? ... Can you always tell an Etonian, even when he goes beat? Is all modern architecture a fraud? Do U-people really talk this way?" Similar questions were raised in the Times Literary Supplement's review, in relation to Mitford's fictional output as a whole: "Would she have been a better novelist if she had 'tried harder', gone in further, dropped the pose of amateurishness, cut the charm, looked beyond the worlds that she knew and, more importantly, loved?"

=== Biographical works ===
The gift for vivid characterisation, which Mitford developed in her fiction, was used to full effect in her four biographical works. In the first of these, Madame de Pompadour, she followed Waugh's advice not to write for experts but to fashion "a popular life like Strachey's Queen Victoria", with "plenty of period prettiness". This remained her yardstick in her subsequent biographical writings. Her own description of Voltaire in Love is "a Kinsey report of his romps with Mme de Châtelet and her romps with Saint-Lambert and his romps with Mme de Boufflers ... I could go on for pages". Acton thought The Sun King the most entertaining introduction to the subject in the English language. Mitford's informal style was remarked on by the literary critic Cyril Connolly, who wrote that her facility for transforming unpromising source material into readable form was a skill that any professional historian might envy. The historian Antonia Fraser considered Mitford an important contributor to the "remorseless process by which historical and biographical sales have soared since 1950".

=== Journalism, letters and other works ===
Mitford did not regard herself as a journalist: nevertheless, her articles were popular, particularly those she contributed on Paris life to The Sunday Times. Thompson describes this series as "a more sophisticated version of A Year in Provence, bringing France to the English in just the way that they most like it". Thompson adds that although Mitford was always a competent writer, it is in her letters, with their freedom of expression and flights of fancy, that her true character emerges. Many have been published within collections; they are, according to The Independent's reviewer: "a delight, full of the sparks of an abrasive and entertaining wit, refreshingly free from politeness".

== List of works ==
(Publisher details are for first publication only)

=== Novels ===
- Highland Fling. London: Thornton Butterworth. 1931. OCLC 12145781.
- Christmas Pudding. London: Thornton Butterworth. 1932. OCLC 639867174.
- Wigs on the Green. London: Thornton Butterworth. 1935. OCLC 5728619.
- Pigeon Pie. London: Hamish Hamilton. 1940. OCLC 709966771.
- The Pursuit of Love. London: Hamish Hamilton. 1945. OCLC 857990796.
- Love in a Cold Climate. London: Hamish Hamilton. 1949. OCLC 563596524.
- The Blessing. London: Hamish Hamilton. 1951. OCLC 752807050.
- Don't Tell Alfred. London: Hamish Hamilton. 1960. OCLC 757838847.

=== Biographies ===
- Madame de Pompadour. London: Hamish Hamilton. 1954. OCLC 432649137. Illustrated edition (1968)
- Voltaire in Love. London: Hamish Hamilton. 1957. OCLC 459588409.
- The Sun King: Louis XIV at Versailles. London: Hamish Hamilton. 1966. OCLC 229419330.
- Frederick the Great. London: Hamish Hamilton. 1970. ISBN 0-241-01922-2.

=== Translation ===
- The Little Hut. London: Hamish Hamilton. 1951. OCLC 317377443. (play translated and adapted from André Roussin's La petite hutte)
- The Princess of Clèves by Madame de Lafayette. 1951.

=== As editor ===
- The Ladies of Alderley: Letters 1841–1850. London: Chapman & Hall. 1938. OCLC 408486.
- The Stanleys of Alderley: Letters 1851–1865. London: Chapman & Hall. 1939. OCLC 796961504.
- Noblesse Oblige: An Inquiry into the Identifiable Characteristics of the English Aristocracy. London: Hamish Hamilton. 1956. OCLC 219758991. The book includes Mitford's essay "The English Aristocracy", first published in Encounter, September 1955.

=== Collections of letters ===
- Mosley, Charlotte, ed. (1993). Love from Nancy: The Letters of Nancy Mitford. London: Hodder & Stoughton. ISBN 978-0-340-53784-8.
- ——, ed. (1996). The Letters of Nancy Mitford and Evelyn Waugh. London: Hodder & Stoughton. ISBN 0-340-63804-4.
- ——, ed. (2007). The Mitfords: Letters Between Six Sisters. London: Fourth Estate. ISBN 978-1-84115-790-0.
- Smith, John Saumarez, ed. (2004). The Bookshop at 10 Curzon Street: Letters between Nancy Mitford and Heywood Hill 1952–73. London: Frances Lincoln. ISBN 978-0-7112-2452-0.

=== Other works ===
Mitford was a prolific writer of articles, reviews, essays and prefaces, some of which were published in two collections: The Water Beetle (Hamish Hamilton, 1962) and A Talent to Annoy (Hamish Hamilton, 1986). Her translation of Madame Lafayette's romantic novel La Princesse de Clèves was published in America in 1950, but was heavily criticised.

== In media ==
Mitford was portrayed by Bessie Carter in the UKTV series Outrageous (2025).
