= Christopher Sykes (writer) =

British writer

Christopher Hugh Sykes FRSL (17 November 1907 – 8 December 1986) was an English writer. Born into the northern English landowning Sykes family of Sledmere, he was the second son of the diplomat Sir Mark Sykes (1879–1919), and his wife, Edith (née Gorst). His sister was Angela Sykes, the sculptor. His politician uncle, also Christopher Sykes, was, for a time, a close friend of Edward VII.

== Life and career ==
Educated at Downside School and Christ Church, Oxford, Sykes was, for a time in his youth, in the Foreign Office, including a stint as an attaché (1928–29) in the British Embassy in Berlin, where Harold Nicolson was then Counsellor. This was followed by a year (1930–31) at the British Legation in Teheran. An early hero was Aubrey Herbert, remembered now as the man who inspired John Buchan's classic thriller Greenmantle.

Though Sykes contemplated making politics his career, he thought that his stammer and also his artistic and imaginative disposition would tell against his success in parliamentary life.

In the preface to his book Crossroads to Israel (page 8), he states that he first went to Israel in 1931, "more or less by accident".

At the School of Oriental Studies in London, he devoted himself to Persian studies in 1933 before travelling in Central Asia during 1933–34 with Robert Byron, who later wrote The Road to Oxiana recounting their long expedition in what was then a country almost unexplored by Western Europeans. In the book, Byron states that Sykes was given an order to leave Persia, but that after negotiations had been carried out, he was able to depart freely from the country, via Afghanistan, in Byron's company.

After returning to England, Sykes and Byron wrote a novel together, Innocence and Design, published in 1935 under the pen-name of Richard Waughburton. A little later, Sykes and Cyril Connolly planned a book with the title of The Little Voice. In common with other projects of Connolly's, the book never got beyond the planning stages. Sykes published in 1936 a biography of the German Persianist Wilhelm Wassmuss; he did not, during later years, include this volume in his list of his publications. A memoir of Byron, killed at sea in 1941, was included in Sykes' best-selling book, Four Studies in Loyalty.

Sykes had an eventful war. Having held, like his famous father, a Territorial Army commission in The Green Howards in 1927–1930, he was commissioned in 1939 as a reserve officer in the regiment's newly formed 7th Battalion. In June 1940, Sykes joined SO1 (later Special Operations Executive), where he was personal assistant to Colonel Cudbert Thornhill.

During October 1941, Sykes was sent out to Tehran as Deputy Director of Special Propaganda under diplomatic cover (Second Secretary at the British Legation) in the aftermath of the Anglo-Soviet invasion of Iran, where he remained until November 1942, when he was transferred to Cairo. Out of a job because his department had been wound up, Sykes found time to write a light novel, High Minded Murder (1944), something of a roman à clef, set in wartime Cairo where Graham Greene's sister Elizabeth was living (Sykes repeatedly mentions Greene in his biography of Waugh). Meanwhile, after failing to find any position as an intelligence officer in the Middle East, Sykes returned to the UK in May 1943, volunteered for the Special Air Service (SAS), and was posted to the Commando Training Depot at Achnacarry Castle, Inverness-shire on 1 July 1943.

As an SAS officer, Sykes, who spoke fluent French but could not pass as a native, undertook extremely hazardous work with the French Resistance. His experiences in this regard were, like his friendship with Byron, depicted in Four Studies in Loyalty (dedicated to the town of Vosges), this time in that book's last chapter.

Sykes is known for his 1975 biography of his friend Evelyn Waugh. While both men had attended Oxford, but a few years remote from each other, Sykes and Waugh met only after the success of Vile Bodies, 1930. He introduced Waugh to Lady Diana Cooper. Waugh would create one of his fictional personalities drawn from her characteristics and ways, Julia Stitch, in Scoop, 1938. Sykes praised Brideshead, Waugh's Catholic epic; the two were both Catholics, but with the notable difference – mentioned by Waugh's son Auberon when reviewing Sykes's book in the October 1975 issue of Books and Bookmen – that whereas Waugh converted to Roman Catholicism in his twenties, Sykes was a cradle Catholic. Sykes nonetheless censured some of Waugh's writing, and admitted to a dislike of the character of Julia Flyte, noting that nobody had yet identified a model for her in contemporary society. Also Sykes makes some comparisons between scenes in Waugh's books and those of Thackeray: for instance, the fox-hunting scene in A Handful of Dust is compared to that in Barry Lyndon.

Sykes is also remembered to a lesser extent for his history of the British Mandate of Palestine, Crossroads to Israel (1965). Of his half-dozen novels, none attained great popularity or fame.

His non-fiction was more successful. Other biographies by him included a life of Orde Wingate (published 1959), which drew attention to Wingate as the possible basis for Waugh's character Brigadier Ritchie-Hook in The Sword of Honour trilogy. Sometimes Wingate was referred to as "Lawrence of Judea" (a phrase that Wingate deplored).

Two subsequent Sykes biographies which achieved substantial renown dealt with, respectively, Lady Astor and Adam von Trott zu Solz.

After 1945 Sykes worked for many years in BBC Radio, where he helped to get Waugh's broadcast tribute to P. G. Wodehouse (who had been captured in Le Touquet by the Germans) on the air, against considerable opposition from Waugh's enemies. Frequently Sykes wrote for several British and American periodicals, including The New Republic, The Spectator, Books and Bookmen, The Observer and the short-lived English Review Magazine. He was invested as a Fellow of the Royal Society of Literature.

== Marriage and family ==
He married Camilla Georgiana, daughter of Sir Thomas Wentworth Russell (great-grandson of the 6th Duke of Bedford) on 25 October 1936. Their son, Mark Richard Sykes (born 9 June 1937), by his second marriage, is father to six children including New York City based fashion writer and novelist Plum Sykes. Writer and photographer Christopher Simon Sykes is a nephew. Writer and journalist Tom Sykes is a grandson.

== Bibliography ==
- Wassmus: 'The German Lawrence', a biography (1936)
- Stranger Wonders, tales of travel (1937)
- High-Minded Murder, a novel, (1944)
- Four Studies in Loyalty, essays including a memoir of Robert Byron (1946)
- Answer to Question 33, a novel (1948)
- Character and Situations, six short stories (1949)
- A Song of a Shirt, a novel (1953)
- Dates & Parties, a novel (1955)
- Two Studies in Virtue, two essays (1955)
- Noblesse Oblige, co-authored (1956)
- Orde Wingate, a biography (1959)
- Cross Roads to Israel, about Palestine (1965)
- Troubled Loyalty, a biography of Adam Von Trott zu Solz (1968)
- Nancy: The Life of Lady Astor, a biography (1972)
- Evelyn Waugh, a biography (1975) ISBN 9780002112024

=== As Richard Waughburton ===
Innocence and Design (1935; written as "Richard Waughburton", jointly with Robert Byron)

== Sources ==
- Dictionary of National Biography
- Cooper, Artemis, Cairo in the War, 1939-1945. London: Hamish Hamilton, 1989 ISBN 0241132800
